= List of ecoregions in Vietnam =

The following is a list of ecoregions in Vietnam defined by the World Wide Fund for Nature (WWF).

== Terrestrial ecoregions ==
Vietnam is in the Indomalayan realm. Ecoregions are sorted by biome.

=== Tropical and subtropical moist broadleaf forests ===
- Cardamom Mountains rain forests
- Luang Prabang montane rain forests
- Northern Annamites rain forests
- Northern Indochina subtropical forests
- Northern Vietnam lowland rain forests
- Red River freshwater swamp forests
- South China-Vietnam subtropical evergreen forests
- Southern Annamites montane rain forests
- Tonle Sap freshwater swamp forests
- Tonle Sap-Mekong peat swamp forests

=== Tropical and subtropical dry broadleaf forests ===
- Central Indochina dry forests
- Southeastern Indochina dry evergreen forests
- Southern Vietnam lowland dry forests

=== Mangroves ===
- Indochina mangroves

== Freshwater ecoregions ==
The freshwater ecoregions of Vietnam include:

- Xi Yiang
- Sông Hồng
- Northern Annam
- Southern Annam
- Mekong River
  - Kratie–Stung Treng
  - Mekong Delta

== Marine ecoregions ==
Vietnam's coastal waters are in the Central Indo-Pacific marine realm.

- Gulf of Thailand
- Gulf of Tonkin
- South China Sea Oceanic Islands (disputed)
- Southern Vietnam
