= List of ecoregions in Laos =

The following is a list of ecoregions in Laos as identified by the World Wide Fund for Nature (WWF).

== Terrestrial ecoregions ==
Laos is in the Indomalayan realm. Ecoregions are sorted by biome.

=== Tropical and subtropical moist broadleaf forests ===
- Luang Prabang montane rain forests
- Northern Annamites rain forests
- Northern Indochina subtropical forests
- Northern Khorat Plateau moist deciduous forests
- Northern Thailand-Laos moist deciduous forests
- Northern Vietnam lowland rain forests
- Southern Annamites montane rain forests

=== Tropical and subtropical dry broadleaf forests ===
- Central Indochina dry forests
- Southeastern Indochina dry evergreen forests

== Freshwater ecoregions ==
The freshwater ecoregions of Laos include:

- Mekong
