= List of ecoregions in Cambodia =

The following is a list of ecoregions in Cambodia.

== Tropical and subtropical moist broadleaf forests ==
- Southern Annamites montane rain forests (Cambodia, Laos, Vietnam)
- Cardamom Mountains rain forests (Cambodia, Thailand, Vietnam)
- Tonle Sap freshwater swamp forests (Cambodia, Vietnam)
- Tonle Sap-Mekong peat swamp forests (Cambodia, Vietnam)

== Tropical and subtropical dry broadleaf forests ==
- Central Indochina dry forests (Laos, Cambodia, Thailand, Vietnam)
- Southeastern Indochina dry evergreen forests (Cambodia, Laos, Thailand, Vietnam)

== Mangroves ==
- Indochina mangroves (Vietnam, Thailand, Cambodia)

== Freshwater ecoregions ==
Freshwater ecoregions:

- Mekong (Burma, Laos, Cambodia, Thailand, Vietnam)
