= Ecoregions in the Philippines =

The Philippine archipelago is one of the world's great reservoirs of biodiversity and endemism. The archipelago includes over 7000 islands, and a total land area of 300,780 km^{2}.

The Philippines was never connected to mainland Asia via land bridges, so the flora and fauna of the islands had to cross ocean straits to reach the Philippines. The Philippines is part of the Indomalayan realm, and its flora and fauna is mostly derived from tropical Asia. Botanically, the Philippines are part of Malesia, a floristic province that includes the Malay Peninsula, Indonesia, and New Guinea. Most of the Malesian flora is derived from tropical Asia, including the dipterocarps, which are the characteristic tree of the Philippine forests. Elements of the Antarctic flora, which originated in the ancient Southern Hemisphere supercontinent of Gondwana, are also present, including ancient conifers like podocarps (Podocarpus, Nageia, Sundacarpus) and araucarias (Agathis).

The ecoregions of the Philippines are defined primarily by the sea levels during the Ice Ages, which were 120 meters lower than at present, as billions of gallons of water were locked away in huge continental ice sheets. This drop in sea level connected many presently separate islands into larger islands, which allowed for exchanges of flora and fauna:

- Greater Luzon included Luzon, Catanduanes, Marinduque, Polillo, and several small islands.
- Greater Mindanao included Mindanao, Basilan, Bohol, Leyte, Samar, and adjacent small islands.
- Greater Palawan included Palawan, Balabac, Busuanga, Culion, Cuyo, and adjacent small islands.
- Greater Negros–Panay included Negros, Panay, Cebu, and Masbate.
- Greater Sulu included most of the Sulu Archipelago, from Tawi Tawi to Jolo.

These formerly-linked islands each constitute a separate ecoregion, as does Mindoro, which remained separate from the rest, along with a few smaller islands, notably Camiguin, Sibuyan, and Siquijor.

Each group of islands that were linked by land bridges in the ice ages also constitutes a separate faunal region. The lack of a land bridge to the Asian continent prevented most of the Asian megafauna, including elephants, rhinoceros, tapirs, tigers, leopards, and gibbons, from reaching the Philippines, although they do inhabit the adjacent Indonesian islands of Sundaland, which were formerly linked to the Asian continent by lowered sea levels.

The other main factor that defines the Philippine ecoregions is elevation; the high mountains of Luzon and Mindanao host distinct montane rain forest ecoregions. The mountains of Luzon are also home to the Luzon tropical pine forests.

== Terrestrial ecoregions ==
by major habitat type
Tropical and subtropical moist broadleaf forests

- Greater Negros-Panay rain forests
- Luzon montane rain forests
- Luzon rain forests
- Mindanao montane rain forests
- Mindanao-Eastern Visayas rain forests
- Mindoro rain forests
- Palawan rain forests
- South China Sea Islands (disputed between China, Malaysia, Philippines, Taiwan, Vietnam)
- Sulu Archipelago rain forests

Tropical and subtropical coniferous forests

- Luzon tropical pine forests

== Freshwater ecoregions ==
- Northern Philippine Islands
- Palawan – Busuanga – Mindoro
- Mindanao
- Lake Lanao

== Marine ecoregions ==
by marine province

=== Central Indo-Pacific ===
- South China Sea
  - South China Sea Islands
- Coral Triangle
  - Western Coral Triangle
    - Palawan/North Borneo
    - Eastern Philippines
    - Sulawesi Sea/Makassar Strait

== See also ==
- Environmental issues in the Philippines
