= Koh Kapik =

Area in Koh Kong, Cambodia

Koh Kapik is an area of Koh Kong province, Cambodia. It consists of intertidal wetlands, river inflows, sand flats, and features Indochina mangroves. Koh Kapik and Associated Islets was designated in 1999 as a Ramsar site, and is also recognised as an Important Bird Area by BirdLife International. Koh Kapik features many endangered species, such as the Sunda pangolin and fishing cat.
