= Red River freshwater swamp forests =

Ecoregion in Red River Delta, Vietnam

Ecoregion: Red River freshwater swamp forests
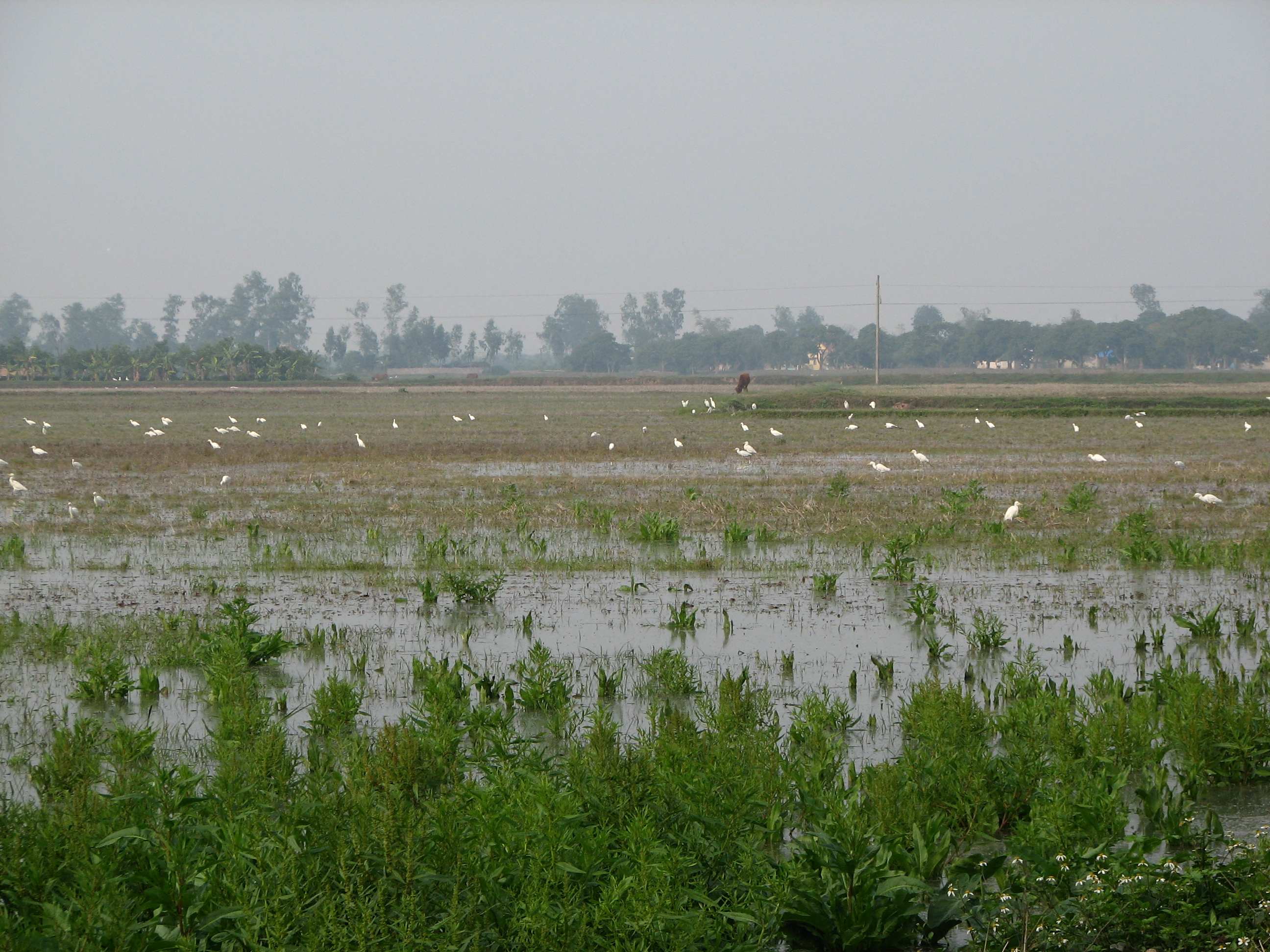
- Near Ha Nam, Vietnam, about 30 miles south of Hanoi

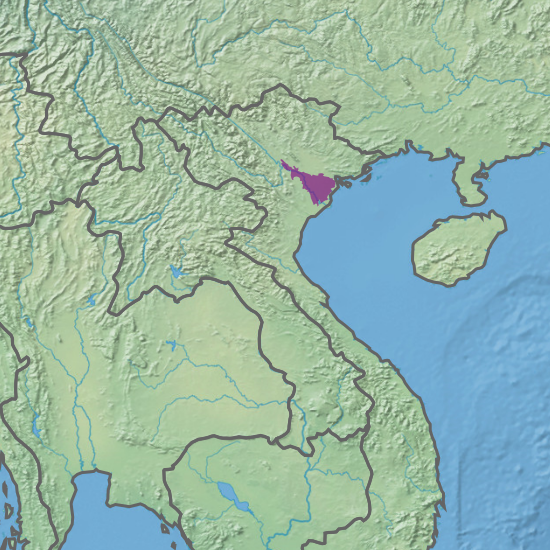
- Ecoregion territory (in purple)

Ecology
- Realm: Indomalayan
- Biome: Tropical and subtropical moist broadleaf forests

Geography
- Area: 10,877 km^{2} (4,200 mi^{2})
- Country: Vietnam
- Coordinates: 20.5°N 106.25°E

The Red River freshwater swamp forests ecoregion (WWF ID:IM0147) covers the freshwater portion of the Hong River ("Red River") delta in northern Vietnam. The ecoregion is separated from the sea by a thin coastal strip of the saltwater mangroves of the Indochina mangroves ecoregion. Very little of the little ecosystem remains; most of the delta has been converted to urbanization, industry, or agriculture. Less than 1% of the ecoregion is protected in significantly sized tracts.

== Location and description ==
The ecoregion is relatively small, just under 11,000 km2, limited to the flat river delta of the Hong River, centered on the cities of Hanoi in the center and Haiphong at the river mouth. The ecoregion is separated from the actual sea coast by a thin strip of the Indochina mangroves ecoregion in the saltwater-affected zone. To the north is the South China-Vietnam subtropical evergreen forests ecoregion, and to the west are the Northern Indochina subtropical forests and Northern Vietnam lowland rain forests ecoregions.

== Climate ==
The climate of the ecoregion is Dry-winter humid subtropical climate (Köppen climate classification (Cwa)). This climate is characterized as having no month averaging below 0 °C (32 °F), at least one month averaging above 22 °C (72 °F), and four months averaging over 10 °C (50 °F). Precipitation in the wet summer months is ten time or more the average of the winter months.

== Flora and fauna ==
Inland of the saltwater mangroves are the freshwater swamp forests, at least in the areas not converted to human use. The forest cover is generally limited to strips along the rivers. Only about 1% (about 100 km2) of the ecoregion is in a core natural state, although 17% is in some form of forest cover, mostly of open evergreen broadleaf trees which consists of Melaleuca trees.
