= Southeastern Indochina dry evergreen forests =

Ecoregion in Southeastern Indochina

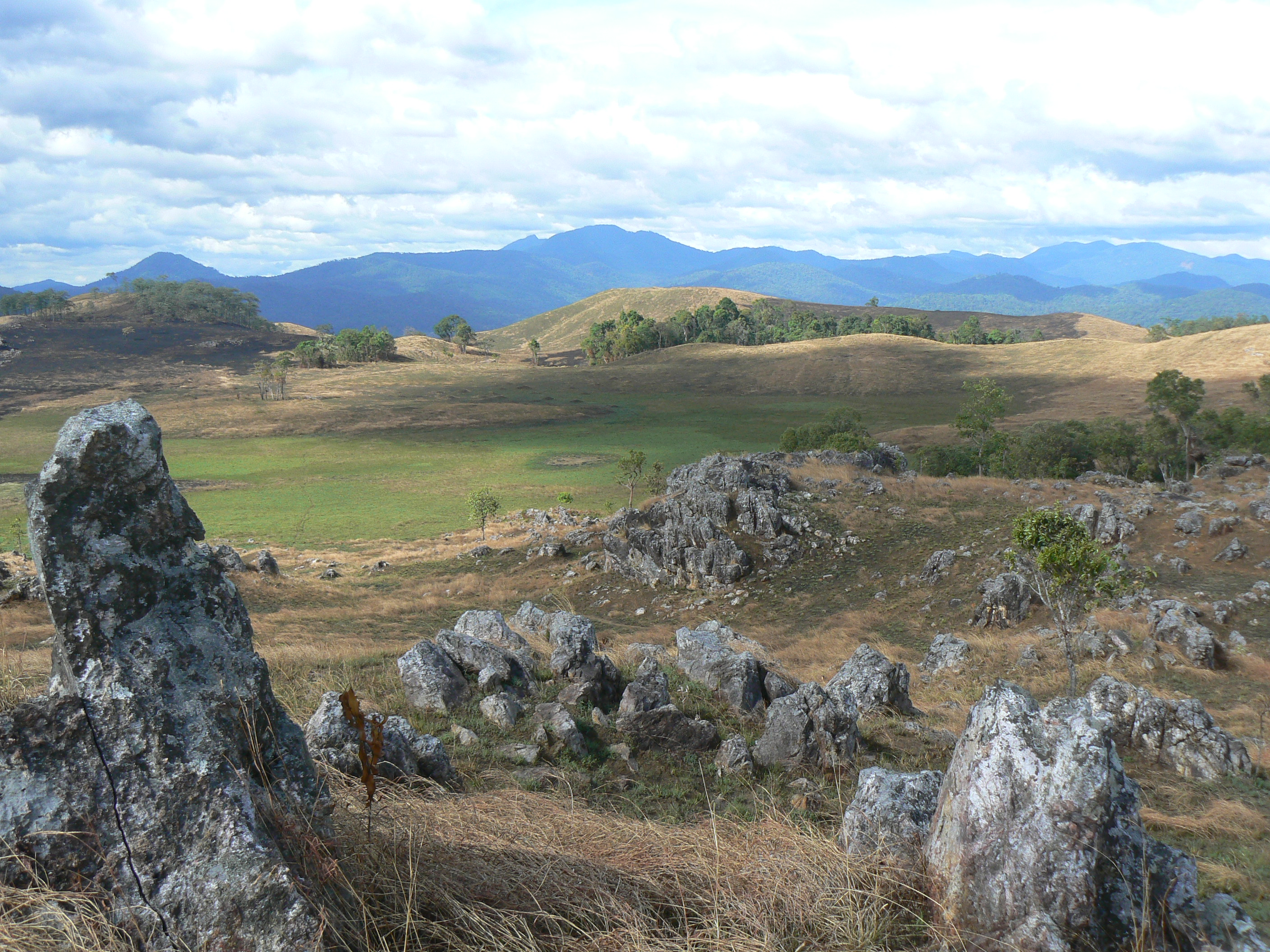
- Virachey National Park in northeast Cambodia

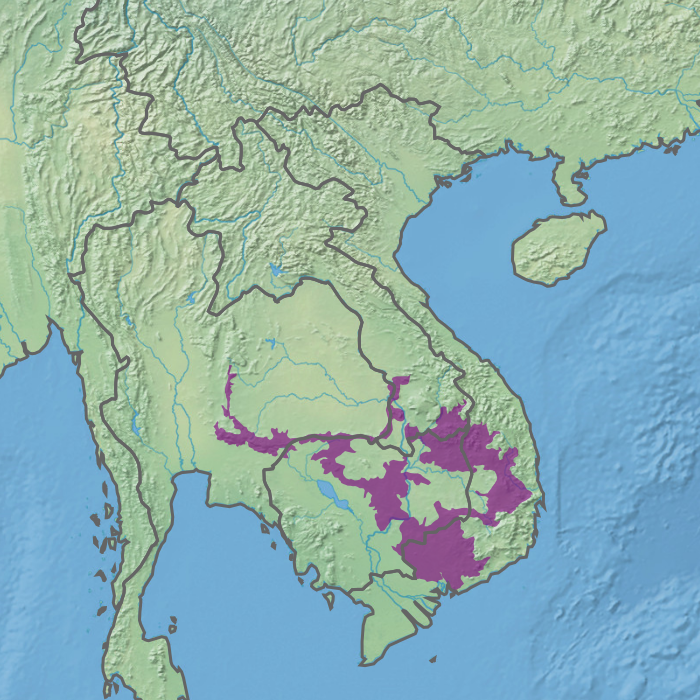
- Ecoregion territory (in purple)

Ecology
- Realm: Indomalayan
- Biome: tropical and subtropical dry broadleaf forests
- Borders: List: Central Indochina dry forests; Indochina mangroves; Southern Annamites montane rain forests; Southern Vietnam lowland dry forests; Tonle Sap freshwater swamp forests; Tonle Sap-Mekong peat swamp forests

Geography
- Area: 123,778 km^{2} (47,791 sq mi)
- Countries: Cambodia; Laos; Thailand; Vietnam

Conservation
- Conservation status: Vulnerable
- Protected: 28,210 km^{2} (23%)

The Southeastern Indochina dry evergreen forests are a tropical dry broadleaf forest ecoregion of Indochina.

== Setting ==
The ecoregion covers an area of 124,300 square kilometers (48,000 sq mi), extending across portions of Cambodia, Laos, Thailand, and Vietnam.

The Southeastern Indochina dry evergreen forests occupy the lower portion of the Mekong Basin, where they are intertwined with the Central Indochina dry forests. The Southern Annamites montane rain forests border the dry evergreen forests on the east, occupying the higher elevations of the Annamite Range. To the south, the Indochina mangroves lie between tropical seasonal forests and the South China Sea. The Tonle Sap-Mekong peat swamp forests and Tonle Sap freshwater swamp forests lie to the southeast, in the seasonally and permanently flooded lowlands along the Tonle Sap and lower Mekong rivers and Tonle Sap Lake.

== Flora ==
The Southeastern Indochina dry evergreen forests are one of three dry broadleaf forest ecoregions with predominantly evergreen trees; trees in dry broadleaf forests typically lose their leaves during the dry season.

== Fauna ==
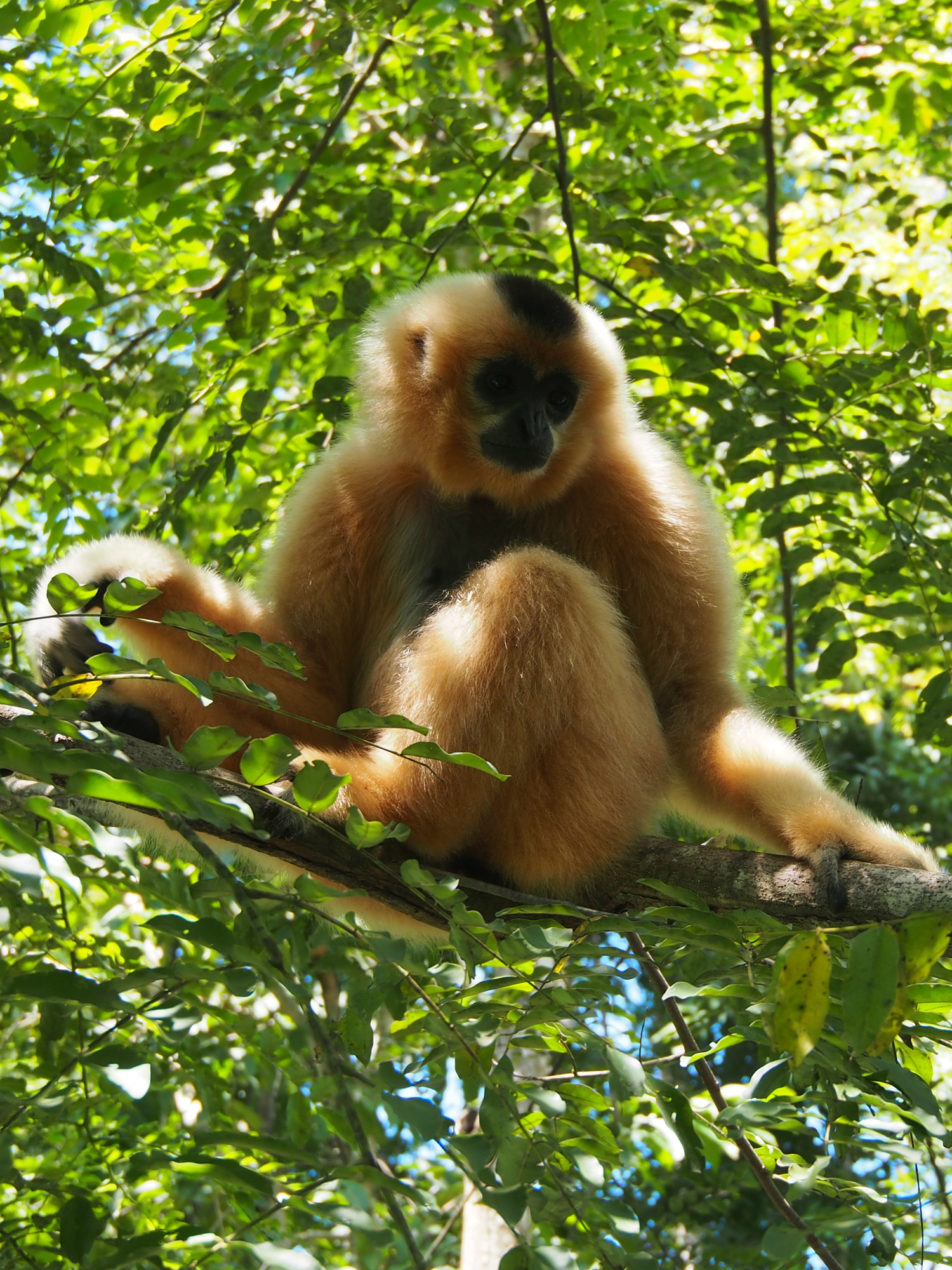
A Golden-cheeked gibbon at Cat Tien National Park, Vietnam

The ecoregion is home to many large mammals, including the Asian elephant (Elephas maximus), tiger (Panthera tigris), previously one of two known populations of the now extinct Javan rhinoceros (Rhinoceros sondaicus annamiticus), Eld's deer (Cervus eldi), banteng (Bos javanicus), gaur (Bos gaurus), clouded leopard (Pardofelis nebulosa), leopard (Panthera pardus), and Malayan sun bear (Ursus malayanus).

== Conservation ==
A 2017 assessment found that 28,210 km^{2}, or 23%, of the ecoregion is in protected areas. Another 23% is forested but outside protected areas.
