= Hainan Island monsoon rain forests =

Ecoregion in Hainan Island, China

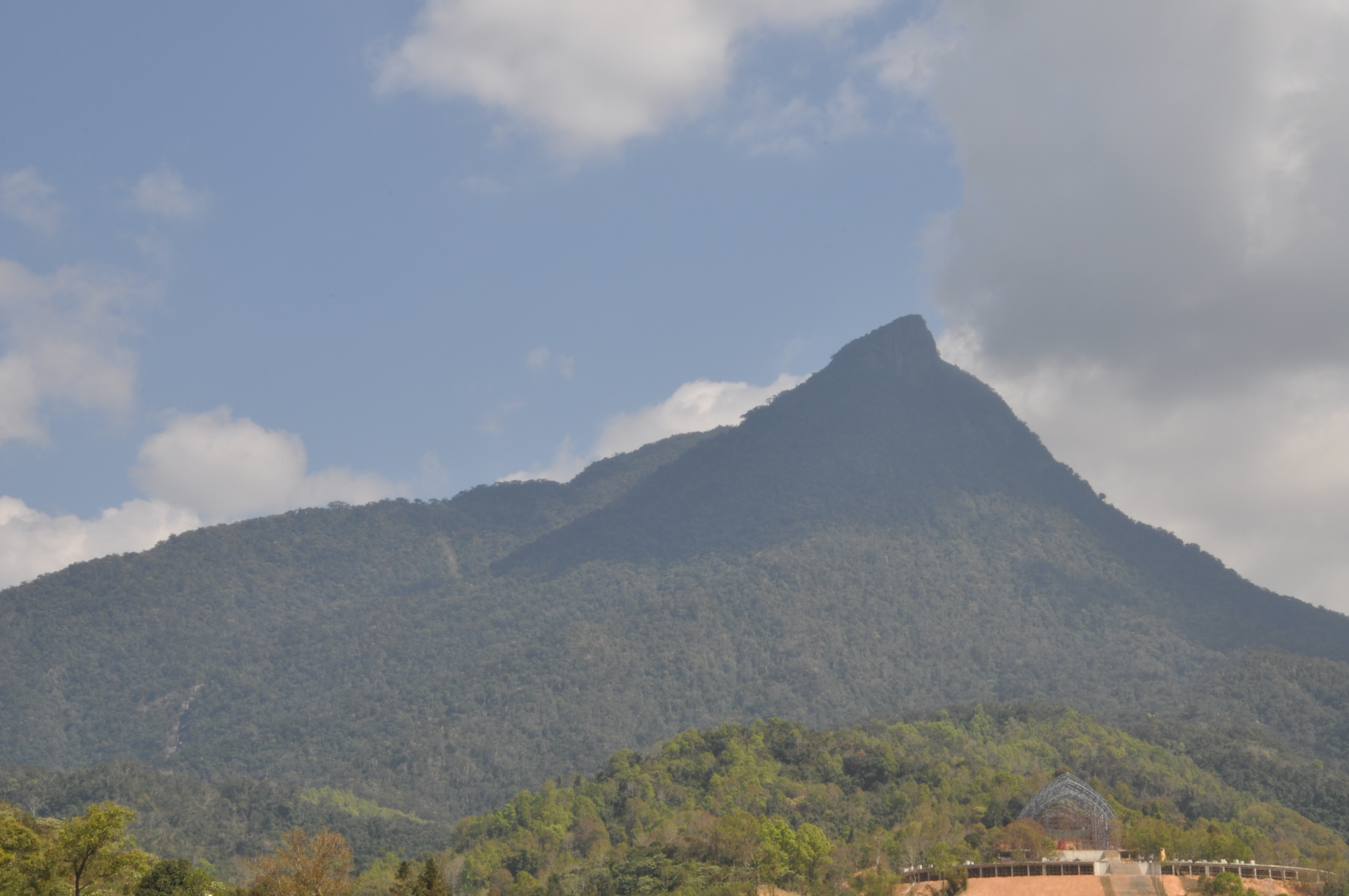
- Wuzhi Mountain, in the middle of Hainan Island

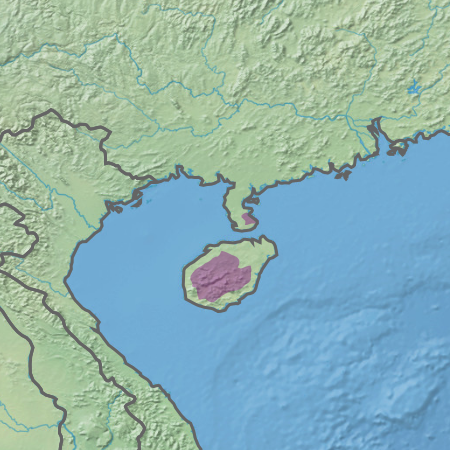
- Ecoregion territory (in purple)

Ecology
- Realm: Indomalayan realm
- Biome: tropical and subtropical moist broadleaf forests
- Borders: South China-Vietnam subtropical evergreen forests

Geography
- Area: 15,540 km^{2} (6,000 sq mi)
- Country: China
- Provinces: Hainan
- Coordinates: 19°00′N 109°40′E

The Hainan Island monsoon rain forests ecoregion (WWF ID: IM0169) covers mountainous interior of Hainan Island in China. The tropical forests receive over 1,000 mm/year of rain, heavily concentrated in the summer rainy season. The island has high levels of biodiversity, with over 4,200 plant species, 630 of which are endemic to the island. The region is under ecological pressure from deforestation for agriculture and timber extraction.

== Location and description ==
Hainan ("South of the Sea") Island is about 13,000 square miles in area, and separated from the Leizhou Peninsula by only 15 miles. The monsoon rain forest ecoregion encompasses the interior mountain range, surrounded by the coastal plains. (The coastal plains fall in an entirely different ecoregion - the South China-Vietnam subtropical evergreen forests ecoregion). The highest point in the Hainan mountains is Wuzhi Mountain at 1,840 metres (6,040 ft). There is a small sector of this ecoregion on the east coast of the Leizhou Peninsula.

== Climate ==
The climate of the ecoregion is Tropical savanna climate - dry winter (Köppen climate classification (Aw)). This climate is characterized by relatively even temperatures throughout the year, and a pronounced dry season. The driest month has less than 60 mm of precipitation, and is drier than the average month. Precipitation averages up 1,000 mm/yr on the west side; 2,000 mm/year on the east side.

== Flora and fauna ==
Because Hainan Island and the Leizhou Peninsula were connected by a land bridge until the Quaternary, there are relatively few endemic genera, but many endemic species. Scientists have recorded 4,200 plant species (including 450 trees), and 98 mammal species. During the dry season before monsoon season in the summer, drought-stressed deciduous trees drop their leaves. The forest canopy is generally sparse, and sufficient light reaches the ground to support a grass under-story. Evergreen trees also occur in this area, especially on shaded slopes that have more retentive soils, and at slightly higher elevation. Three kinds of trees from Dipterocarpaceae can be found in this ecoregion: Vatica mangachapoi, Hopea hainanensis, and Hopea exalata (now Hopea reticulata). Tropical montane forests at the middle elevations include chinquapin (Castanopsis), stone oaks (Lithocarpus), and laurels (Lauraceae). More savanna-like vegetation is found higher and drier areas of the interior, with brush and silk trees (Albizia procera). Cloud forests grow above 1,600 meters.

== See also ==
- List of ecoregions in China
