= Greater Negros–Panay rain forests =

Ecoregion in the Philippines

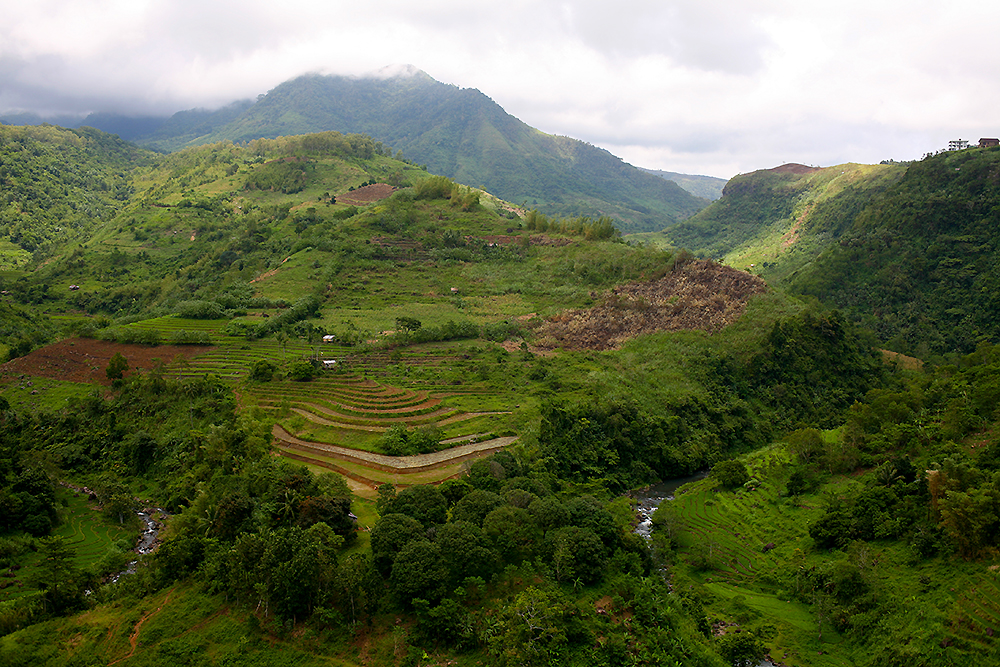
- Kanlaon, Negros Island

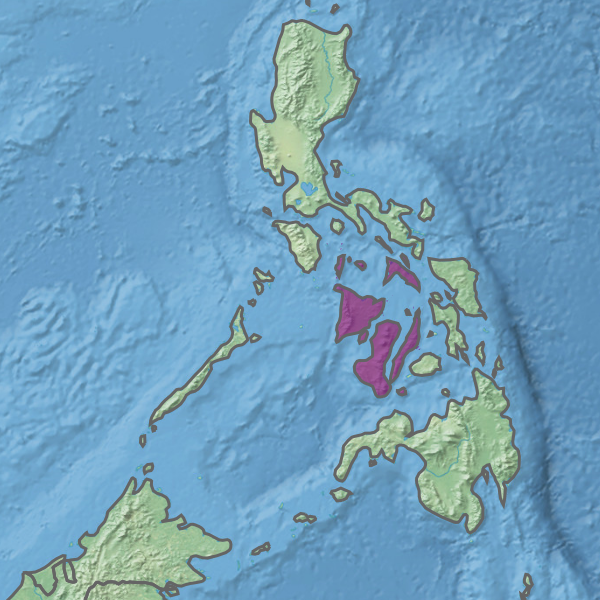
- Ecoregion territory (in purple)

Ecology
- Realm: Indomalayan

Geography
- Area: 35,074 km^{2} (13,542 mi^{2})
- Country: Philippines
- Coordinates: 11.25°N 122.50°E

The Greater Negros–Panay rain forests ecoregion (WWF ID: IM0114) covers the central Visayan Islands in the Philippines, including the islands of Panay, Negros, Cebu, Masbate, Sibuyan, Ticao, Guimaras, Romblon, Tablas, Siquijor, and Bohol, but excludes Leyte and Samar. During the last ice age, these were all on the same island. The lack of a land bridge to Asia during the ice age kept most Asian megafauna, including elephants and tigers, from reaching the Philippines and the Visayan Islands, which hosts many unique and endemic species with some exclusive only to an island.

== Location and description ==
Panay, Negros and the islands around them in the Visayas occupy the central position in the Philippines. Most of the islands are rugged, with the highest point being 2,465 metres (8,087 ft) at Mt. Kanlaon.

== Climate ==
The climate of the ecoregion is Tropical rainforest climate (Köppen climate classification (Af)). This climate is characterized as hot, humid, and having at least 60 mm of precipitation every month. The islands receive precipitation averaging 2,417 mm/year, with July and August being the wettest months.

== Flora and fauna ==
Vegetation in the ecoregion depends on distance from the coast, and elevation. Beach vegetation merges into beach forest away from the coast, featuring trees of genus Casuarina (a tall evergreen with feather-like leaves) and Barringtonia. There are also mangroves along the coast that give way to tropical lowland rain forest farther inland. These lowland forests are dominated by trees of genus (Dipterocarpus), but the dipterocarps are joined by Pterocarpus indicus, Pandans Pandanus, and others.

Upper hill dipterocarp forests are found from 650 meters to 1,000 meters, where the dominant trees are Shorea polysperma, oaks, chestnuts, and elaeocarps. Montane forests begin at about 1,000 meters featuring oaks and laurels.

There are 58 species of mammals in the ecoregion, 13 of which are endemic. Large mammals of conservation interest include the Philippine spotted deer (Cervus alfredi), and the critically endangered Visayan warty pig (Sus cebifrons).

One island in particular, the isolated, mountainous Sibuyan Island contains six endemic mammal species. It also has 700 species of vascular plants, 54 of which are endemic, and 131 bird species, a high level of diversity for a small island.

== Protected areas ==
Over 9% of the ecoregion is officially protected. These protected areas include:

- Mount Guiting-Guiting Natural Park
- Mount Kanlaon National Park
- Sibalom Natural Park

== See also ==
- Ecoregions in the Philippines
