= Maldives–Lakshadweep–Chagos Archipelago tropical moist forests =

Broadleaf forest region in South Asia

Maldives-Lakshadweep-Chagos Archipelago tropical moist forests
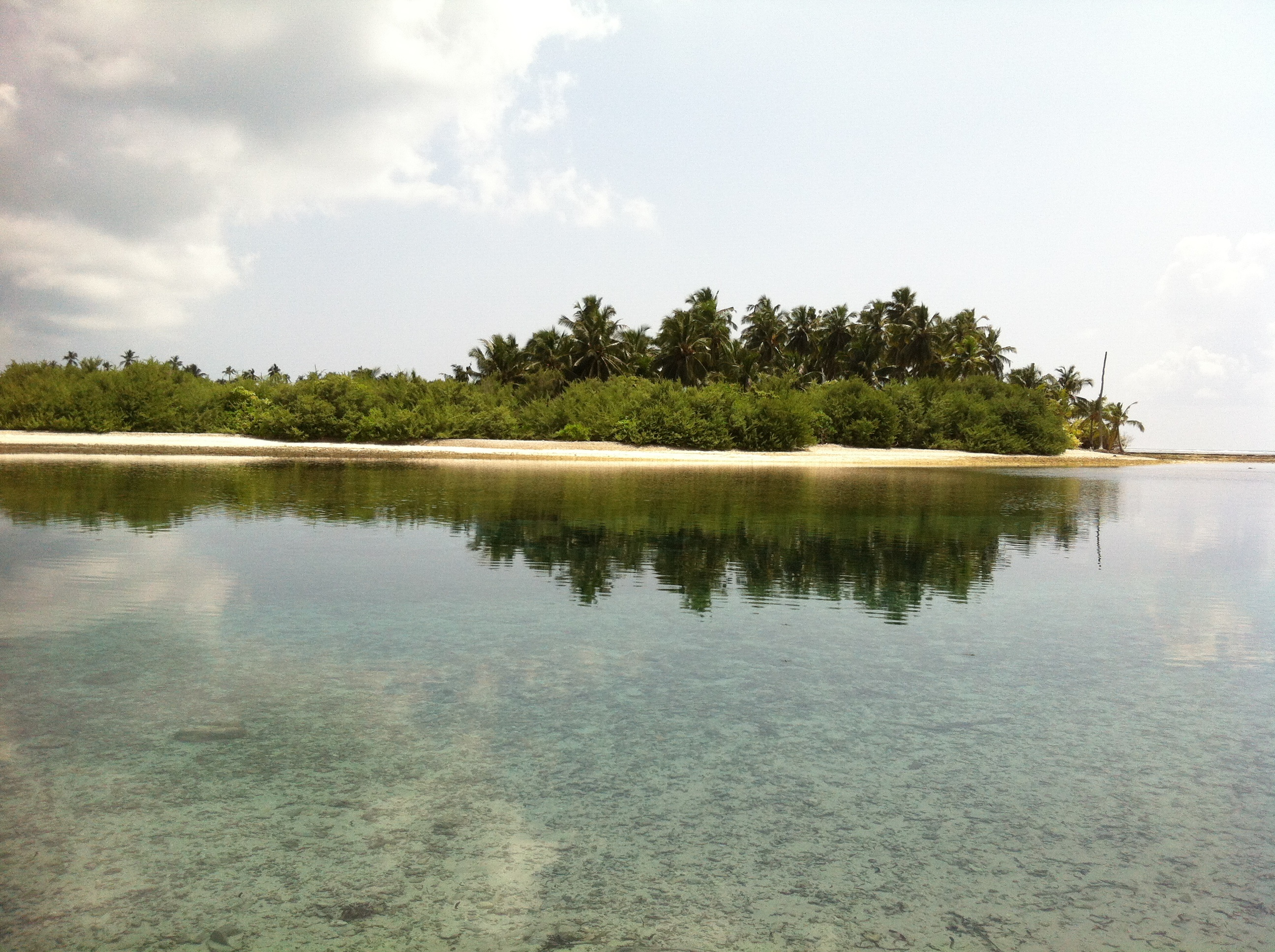
- Islet near Rathafandoo, Maldives

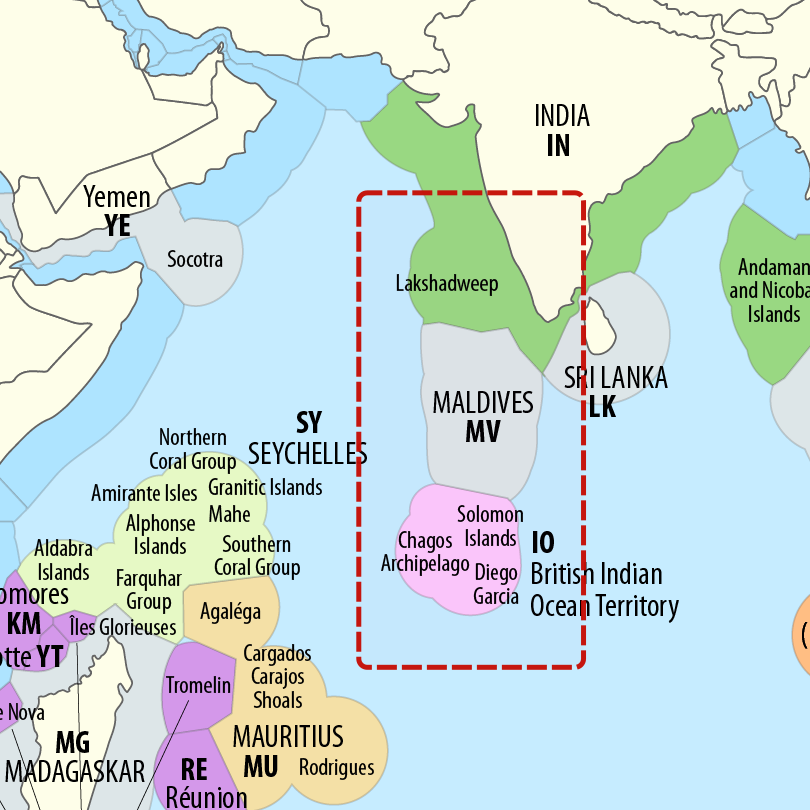
- Ecoregion territory (islands inside red-dashed box)

Ecology
- Realm: Indomalayan realm
- Biome: tropical and subtropical moist broadleaf forests

Geography
- Area: 277 km^{2} (107 sq mi)
- Countries: India (Lakshadweep); Maldives, United Kingdom (British Indian Ocean Territory)

Conservation
- Conservation status: Critical/endangered
- Protected: 73 km^{2} (26%)

The Maldives–Lakshadweep–Chagos Archipelago tropical moist forests is a tropical moist broadleaf forest ecoregion in South Asia. It spans a chain of coralline islands in the Indian Ocean, including Lakshadweep (Laccadive Islands), a union territory of India; the Maldives, an independent country; and the British Indian Ocean Territory, an overseas territory of the United Kingdom.

== Geography ==
The ecoregion is made up of low islands made mostly of coral sand, generally no more than 5 meters above sea level, and surrounded by extensive coral reefs. The islands rest on the Chagos–Laccadive Ridge, an oceanic ridge and plateau, and extend 2,550 km north and south across the equator, from latitude 14º N to 8º S. Lakshadweep lies to the north, 300 km west of India's southwest coast. Lakshadweep consists of 36 small islands between 8º - 14º N, with a total land area of 32 km^{2}. The Maldives are the largest island group, with approximately 1190 islands between 7º N and the equator. The Chagos Archipelago lies between 5° and 8° S, and constitute the British Indian Ocean Territory. Diego Garcia, a huge atoll, is the largest of the Chagos islands.

The coral sand that makes up the islands comes from the skeletons of reef corals which have been broken up into fine particles by wave action. Wind, waves, and currents form islands from the sand. The coral reefs provide the raw material for the islands, and the reefs provide protection from erosive waves and currents that allows the islands to form and persist. Coral sand is highly porous, and water and organic nutrients quickly leach through it. The islands' small size, low relief, and porous soil mean that, despite high rainfall, they have no running streams; rainfall percolates 1–3 meters below the ground to shallow freshwater aquifers lying above salt water.

== Climate ==
The climate of the island is tropical and equatorial, with warm temperatures that stay relatively constant throughout the year. Rainfall occurs mostly with the April-to-October southwest monsoon, and there is a dry season from December to March associated with the northeast monsoon off the Asian continent. Rainfall varies from 1600 mm annually in dry parts of Lakshadweep to 3,800 mm per year in the southern Maldives.

== Flora ==
The vegetation on the islands is dependent on the underlying soils. Pioneer plants colonize areas of fresh sand, and stabilize them. Areas with infertile soil are generally covered with sedges and shrubs that can tolerate drought and salt spray. Sedges of genus Cyperus and the shrub Scaevola taccada are the most common. In the Laccadive Islands the low tree Argusia is sometimes found with the sedges and shrubs.

Where plant cover persists over time, organic material can accumulate in the soil and sustain larger and more diverse plants. Tropical rain forests grow where soils and fresh water are favorable. Most of the original forests have been cleared for coconut plantations and other crops, but small areas of native vegetation remain, some disturbed and others relatively intact.

The Chagos Islands were the last settled and are the least disturbed. Plant communities on the islands include:

- littoral shrubland is found along the seaward shores of the islands. Scaevola taccada is the dominant shrub species, growing from 2 to 5 meters high. The shrubs Tournefortia argentea and Suriana maritima are found close to the shore, along with the vine Ipomoea macrantha.
- Hernandia forest is dominated by the Chinese-lantern tree Hernandia nymphaeifolia, sometimes with coconut palm (Coco nucifera) and Terminalia catappa, and the smaller trees Morinda citrifolia, Guettarda speciosa, and Neisosperma oppositifolium. The fern Asplenium nidus grows on the forest floor and as an epiphyte in the trees.
- Calophyllum forest is dominated by the tree Calophyllum inophyllum, typically in pure stands, forming a dense canopy with little understory growth. The trees can grow to large size, with trunks up to two metres in diameter.
- Barringtonia forest is dominated by Barringtonia asiatica, which can grow to a similar size as the Calophyllum trees.
- Cordia forest is dominated by the tree Cordia subcordata, either in pure stands or mixed with Hernandia nymphaeifolia, Morinda citrifolia, and Neisosperma oppositifolium.
- Pisonia forest occurs rarely, and is characterized by the tree Pisonia grandis, which can attain large size. The tree is associated with seabird colonies, since its sticky seeds are spread by birds and it can tolerate guano-derived soils.
- Guettarda forest is dominated by the low tree Guettarda speciosa, with smaller numbers of Neisosperma oppositifolium. It may be a transitional zone or stage between littoral shrubland and other forest types.
- Casuarina woodland are woodlands dominated by Casuarina equisetifolia. Its needle-like leaves typically form a thick layer of litter that limits the growth of understory plants, but sometimes it has an understory of shrubs including Premna serratifolia and Scaevola taccada.
- Coconut woodland includes both abandoned plantations and natural woodlands, either in pure stands or mixed with Hernandia, Guettarda, and Neisosperma. Understory plants include Asplenium nidus, native herbs Boerhavia albiflora, Fimbristylis cymosa, and Stenotaphrum micranthum.

Freshwater marshes are found where the water table is high, and saltwater wetlands and mangrove forests grow in sheltered shoreline areas. A 2,500 km^{2} mangrove forest remains on Minicoy island, and Bruguiera parviflora is the predominant mangrove species.

The islands have few endemic plants, and the native plants are mostly typical of Indo-Pacific coral islands. The ancient origins of the islands' plant species include Sri Lanka (44%), Africa (28%), and Malesia (25%). The present flora of the islands includes both native species and species that were intentionally or unintentionally introduced by humans.

== Fauna ==
The islands have few terrestrial animals.

The islands are home to subspecies of Indian flying fox (Pteropus giganteus ariel) and small flying fox (Pteropus hypomelanus maris). Both subspecies are endemic to the ecoregion.

The Maldivian pond heron (Ardeola grayii phillipsi), a subspecies of the Indian pond heron, is endemic to the islands.

Thirteen or fourteen seabird species nest in the Maldives, often on small islets. The Chagos and Lakshadweep also have large rookeries. These include the white tern (Gygis alba monte), lesser frigatebird (Fregata ariel iredalei), black-naped tern (Sterna sumatrana), bridled tern (Onychoprion anaethetus), and greater crested tern (Thalasseus bergii). The red-footed booby (Sula sula) has a large population in the Chagos islands.

The islands' native reptiles include two geckos, Hemidactylus frenatus and H. parvimaculatus, the Oriental garden lizard (Calotes versicolor) and another agamid lizard, the white-spotted supple skink (Lygosoma albopunctatum), and two snakes, the Indian wolf snake (Lycodon aulicus) and Brahminy blind snake (Indotyphlops braminus).

Two native amphibians have been found on the islands, the Indian burrowing frog (Sphaerotheca breviceps) and Asian common toad (Duttaphrynus melanostictus).

== History ==
Lakshadweep and the Maldives have been settled for thousands of years. The people of the Laccadives speak a dialect of Malayalam, the predominant language in the adjacent Indian state of Kerala. The people of the Maldives and Minicoy in Lakshadweep speak Maldivian, also known as Dhivehi, an Indo-Aryan language most closely related to Sinhala spoken in nearby Sri Lanka.

There is no record of permanent settlement on the Chagos Archipelago until 1793, when the French established a settlement and coconut plantations on Diego Garcia. The French brought enslaved people to the islands to work in the plantations. Their descendants, the Chagossians, speak a version of Bourbonnais Creole, a French-based creole language also spoken on Réunion and Mauritius in the southwestern Indian Ocean.

The British consolidated control over the islands at the end of the 18th century. Lakshadweep was administered as part of British India, the Chagos Islands were administered from Mauritius, and the Maldives had local rulers under a British protectorate.

Settlers brought food crops to the islands, and domestic animals including cats, chickens, goats, rabbits, house mice, black rats (Rattus rattus), Asian house shrews (Suncus murinus) and donkeys. Coconut plantations were expanded during the 19th century and became the islands' major export crop. Important island crops currently include bananas, coconuts, sweet potatoes, mangoes (Mangifera indica), chico (Pouteria sapota), yams, taro, millet, watermelons, citrus, and pineapples.

India, including Lakshadweep, became independent in 1947. The Maldives became independent in 1965. The UK split administration of the Chagos Archipelago from that of Mauritius in 1965, three years prior to Mauritian independence. In the late 1960s, the UK government leased Diego Garcia to the United States, which turned it into a naval base. The Chagossians were expelled from the islands and resettled in Mauritius, the Seychelles, and the UK. Mauritius still contests the UK's sovereignty over the islands, and the Chagossians continue to contest the legality of their expulsion and are seeking to return home.

== Protected areas ==
A 2017 assessment found that 73 km^{2}, or 26%, of the ecoregion is in protected areas.
