= Tonle Sap–Mekong peat swamp forests =

Ecoregion in Cambodia and southern Vietnam

Tonle Sap-Mekong peat swamp forests
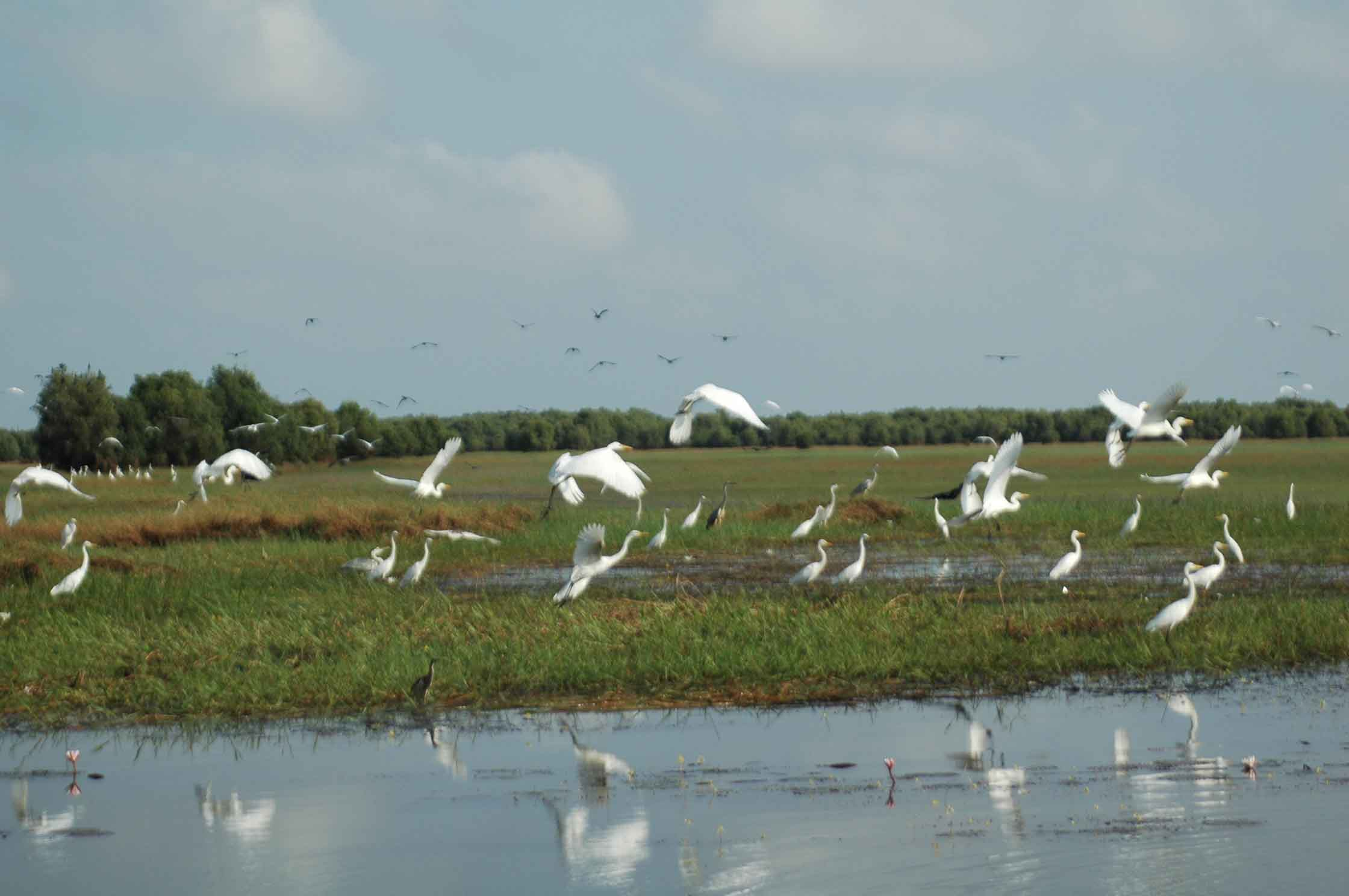
- Wetlands in Tràm Chim National Park, Vietnam

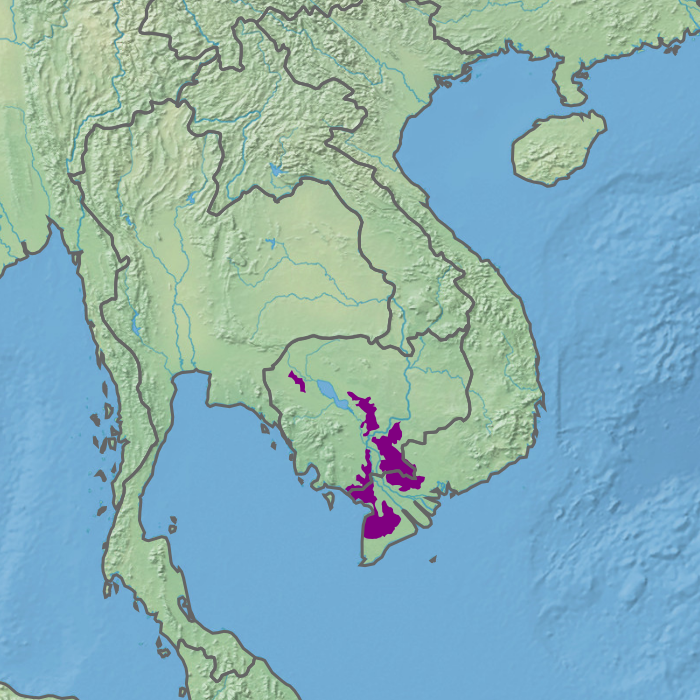
- Ecoregion territory (in purple)

Ecology
- Realm: Indomalayan
- Biome: Tropical and subtropical moist broadleaf forests

Geography
- Area: 29,526 km^{2} (11,400 mi^{2})
- Country: Cambodia, Vietnam
- Coordinates: 10°N 105°E

The Tonle Sap-Mekong peat swamp forests ecoregion (WWF ID: IM0165) covers a patchwork of areas permanently inundated with fresh water along the Tonle Sap River and Mekong River floodplains in Cambodia and Vietnam. The terrain is mostly flat, with extensive agricultural fields, reed beds, and degraded shrub forest. Less than 10% of the region is in its original state, and less than 1% is protected. Habitat in the region is distinguished from the Tonle Sap freshwater swamp forests ecoregion that runs through the middle, as that ecoregion is only seasonally flooded.

== Location and description ==
There are four main sectors to the ecoregion. The smallest is northwest of Tonle Sap Lake on the outer edge of the lakes wetlands. A second sector is to the east of the Tonle Sap River. A third stretches across the Cambodia-Vietnam border on the left bank of the Mekong, and the fourth spreads along the south side of the Mekong Delta. The ecoregion is set back from the saltwater-affected coast, which is in the Indochina mangroves ecoregion. In much of the Vietnamese portions of the ecoregion, the water table rises to the surface, and the soils area heavy with organic material.

== Climate ==
The climate of the ecoregion is Tropical savanna climate - dry winter (Köppen climate classification (Aw)). This climate is characterized by relatively even temperatures throughout the year, and a pronounced dry season. The driest month has less than 60 mm of precipitation, and is drier than the average month.

== Flora and fauna ==
85% of the region has been brought under cultivation; only 15% of the land is forested. On alluvial clay soils in the region there are extensive wetlands featuring sedge and grass species such as Phragmites karka, hardy sugar cane (Tripidium arundinaceum, and Coix gigantea. A type of swamp found nearest the brackish mangroves are known as 'paperbark swamps', dominated by Long-leaved paperbark (Melaleuca leucadendra), a member of the myrtle family. The paperbark swamps have been reduced but are currently the focus of reforesting efforts as they store water and help to reduce flooding.

== Protected areas ==
Except for small portions of the ecoregion extending into the Tonle Sap Biosphere Reserve, there are few protected areas.

- Tonlé Sap Biosphere Reserve, centered on Tonle Sap Lake
- Borey Cholsar Wildlife Sanctuary
- Boeung Prek Lapouv Ramsar Site
- Tràm Chim National Park an important wetland of reed beds used by vulnerable waterbirds
- U Minh Thượng National Park and U Minh Hạ National Park are two areas of high biodiversity in the southern Mekong Delta
- Láng Sen Wetland Reserve
- Gáo Giồng Nature Reserve
- Trà Sư Cajuput Forest
