= Mindanao montane rain forests =

Ecoregion in Mindanao, the Philippines

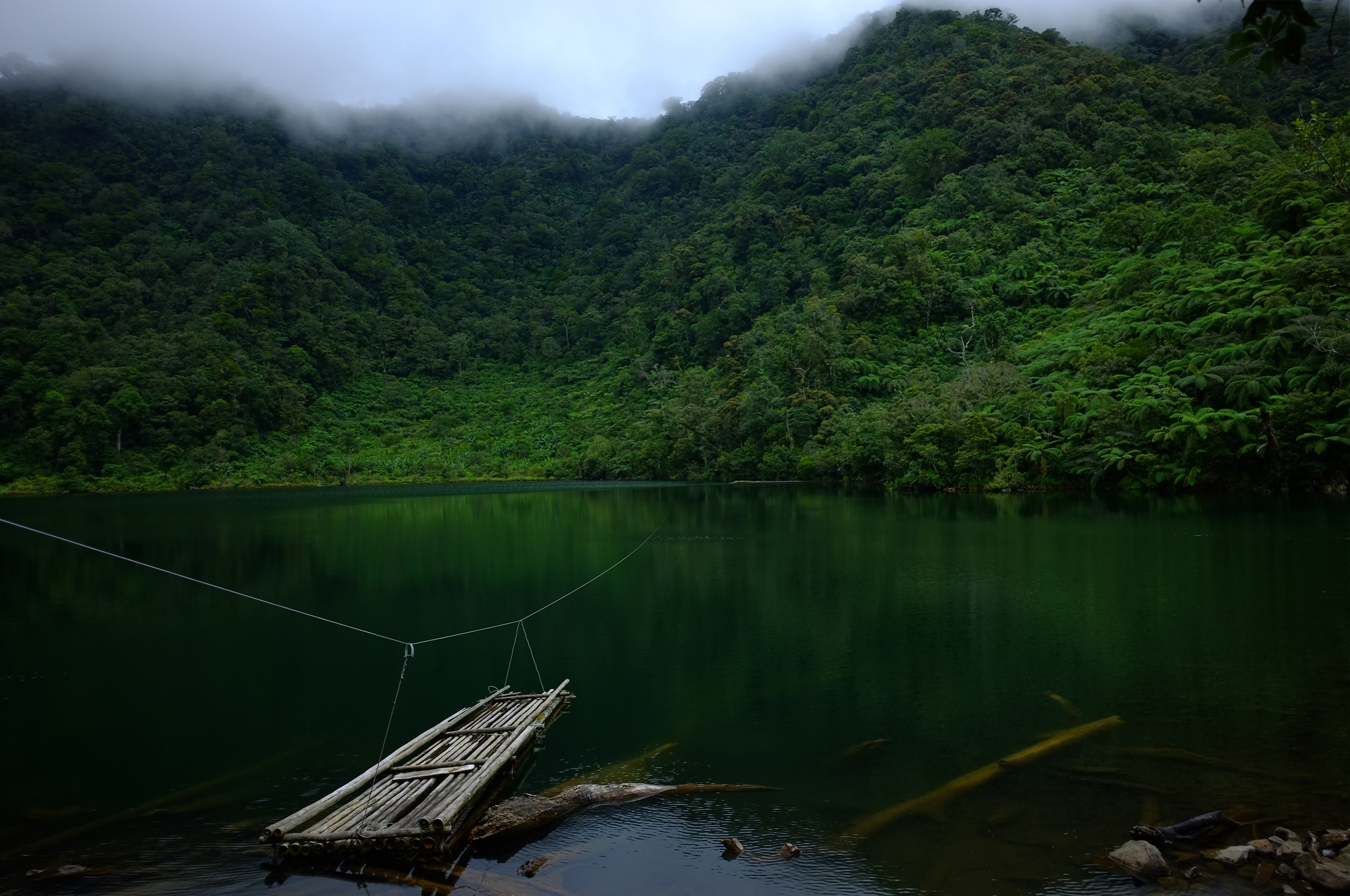
- Lake Duminagat, Mount Malindang

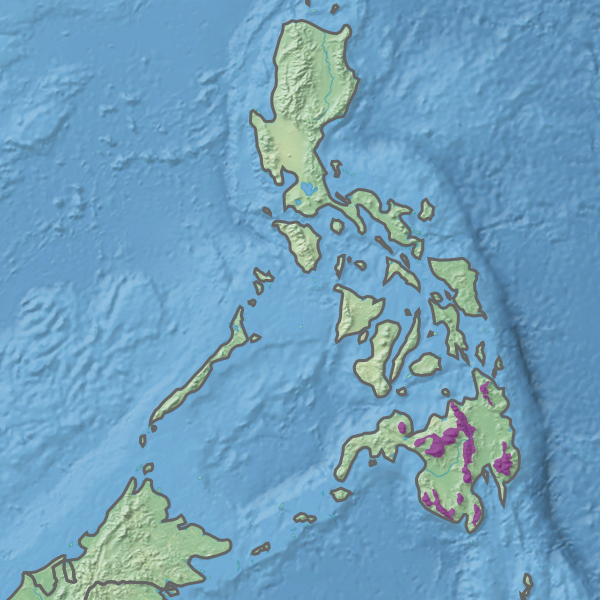
- Ecoregion territory (in purple)

Ecology
- Realm: Indomalayan
- Biome: Tropical and subtropical moist broadleaf forests
- Borders: Mindanao–Eastern Visayas rain forests

Geography
- Area: 18,238 km^{2} (7,042 mi^{2})
- Country: Philippines
- Coordinates: 8.15°N 124.25°E

The Mindanao montane rain forests ecoregion (WWF ID:IM0128) covers the montane forests - the zone between the lowland forest and the treeline - in the mountains on the island of Mindanao in the Philippines. Because the ecoregion covers only elevations above 1,000 metres (3,300 ft), it exists in seven discontinuous patches surrounded by lowland rainforest. Biodiversity is high, both because of the isolation of separate mountain ranges that have led to species variation within the island, and because of the elevational zonation. Because most of the surrounding lowland forest has been cleared for human use, the montane regions have become an important refuge for rare and endemic species.

== Location and description ==
The largest sector of the ecoregion runs up the central cordillera of the island, the Pantaron Mountain Range. Together with the disconnected smaller mountain ranges on the island, the average elevation is 1,057 metres (3,468 ft), with a minimum of 188 metres (617 ft) and a maximum of 2,954 metres (9,692 ft) at Mount Apo, about 20 km southwest of Davao City. The ecoregion surrounding the montane forests, at elevations below 1,000 meters, is the Mindanao-Eastern Visayas rain forests ecoregion.

== Climate ==
The climate of the ecoregion is Tropical rainforest climate (Köppen climate classification (Af)). This climate is characterized as hot, humid, and having at least 60 mm of precipitation every month.

== Flora ==
The ecoregion has been spared much of the forest clearing of the lowlands. 65% of the region is broadleaf evergreen closed forest, 15% is other closed forest, 13% is open forest, and 6% is herbaceous cover. The types of forest depend on elevation, and the associated temperature, aspect, and precipitation profiles. At the lowest elevations the montane forest is an extension of the dipterocarp forests of the lowlands; individual members of the family Dipterocarpaceae may be found up to 1,500 meters. As elevations increase, the diversity of tree species increase, and there is an increase in tree ferns and lianas such as rattan. Above the montane forest level are elfin woodlands (mossy forests with stunted trees), and above that are summit grasslands.

== Fauna ==
Animal species vary widely in the ecoregion, as unconnected mountain ranges developed different habitats. As an example, there are 31 species of birds in the ecoregion that are polytypic; of these 16 have differences that are due to the isolated mountain ranges. Mammals of conservation interest in the region include the Philippine warty pig Sus philippensis, the endemic Mindanao moonrat (Podogymnura truei), and the endangered Mindanao shrew (Crocidura grandis), and the endangered Giant golden-crowned flying fox (Acerodon jubatus).

== Protected areas ==
Over 23% of the ecoregion is officially protected. These protected areas include:

- Mount Apo Natural Park
- Lake Dapao National Park
- Mount Malindang Natural Park
