= South China–Vietnam subtropical evergreen forests =

Ecoregion in South China and Vietnam

South China-Vietnam subtropical evergreen forests
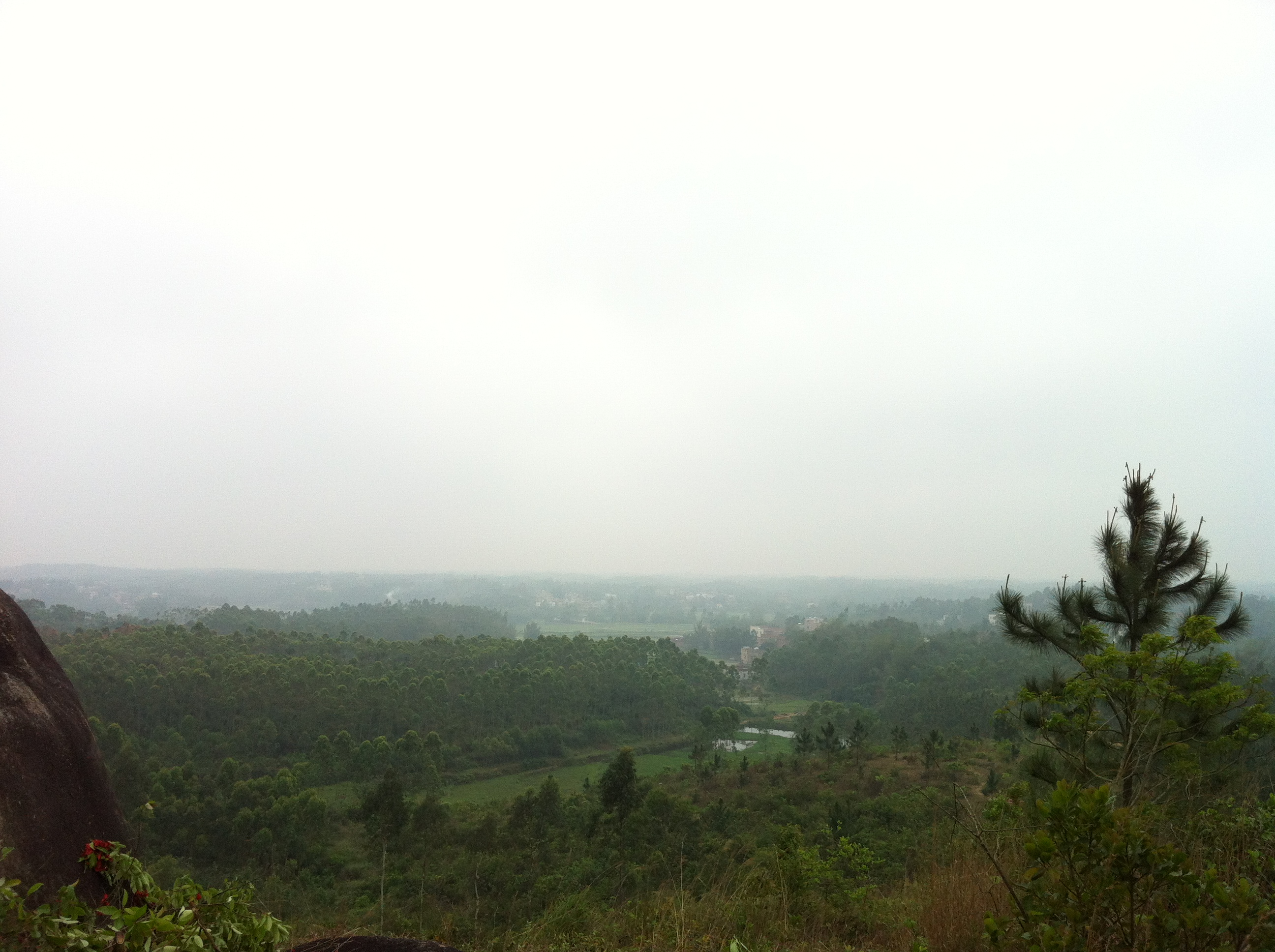
- Lianjiang, Zhanjiang, Guangdong, China

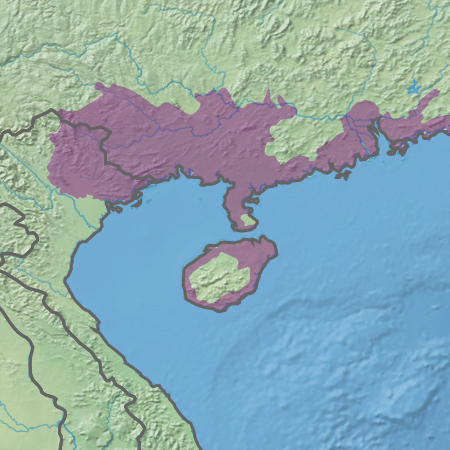
- Ecoregion territory (in purple)

Ecology
- Realm: Indomalayan
- Biome: tropical and subtropical moist broadleaf forests
- Borders: List: Hainan Island monsoon rain forests; Jiang Nan subtropical evergreen forests; Northern Indochina subtropical forests; Red River freshwater swamp forests; Yunnan Plateau subtropical evergreen forests

Geography
- Area: 224,293 km^{2} (86,600 sq mi)
- Countries: China; Vietnam
- Provinces and regions of China: Guangdong; Guangxi; Hainan; Hong Kong; Macau
- Coordinates: 21°40′N 110°00′E

The South China-Vietnam subtropical evergreen forests ecoregion (WWF ID: IM0149) covers the mountainous coastal region of southeastern China and northeastern Vietnam. The ecoregional also covers the coastal plain along the South China Sea and Hainan Island. The area has significant biodiversity and ecological importance, with high levels of both endemic and threatened species. Rapid urban expansion is reducing biologically-rich forests and wetlands. Ecologically, the subtropical forests are at the northeastern extent of the Indomalayan realm.

== Location and description ==
The ecoregion stretches from the northeastern corner of Vietnam, across the lower half of southeastern China, and down into coastal Hainan Island. To the north is the watershed of the Pearl River, and to the south is the South China Sea. The terrain is mountainous for the most part, except along the coasts and around the Leizhou Peninsula. The ecoregion runs across the southern half of Guangxi and Guangdong Provinces, with the major Guangzhou/Shenzhen/Hong Kong urban area in its east.

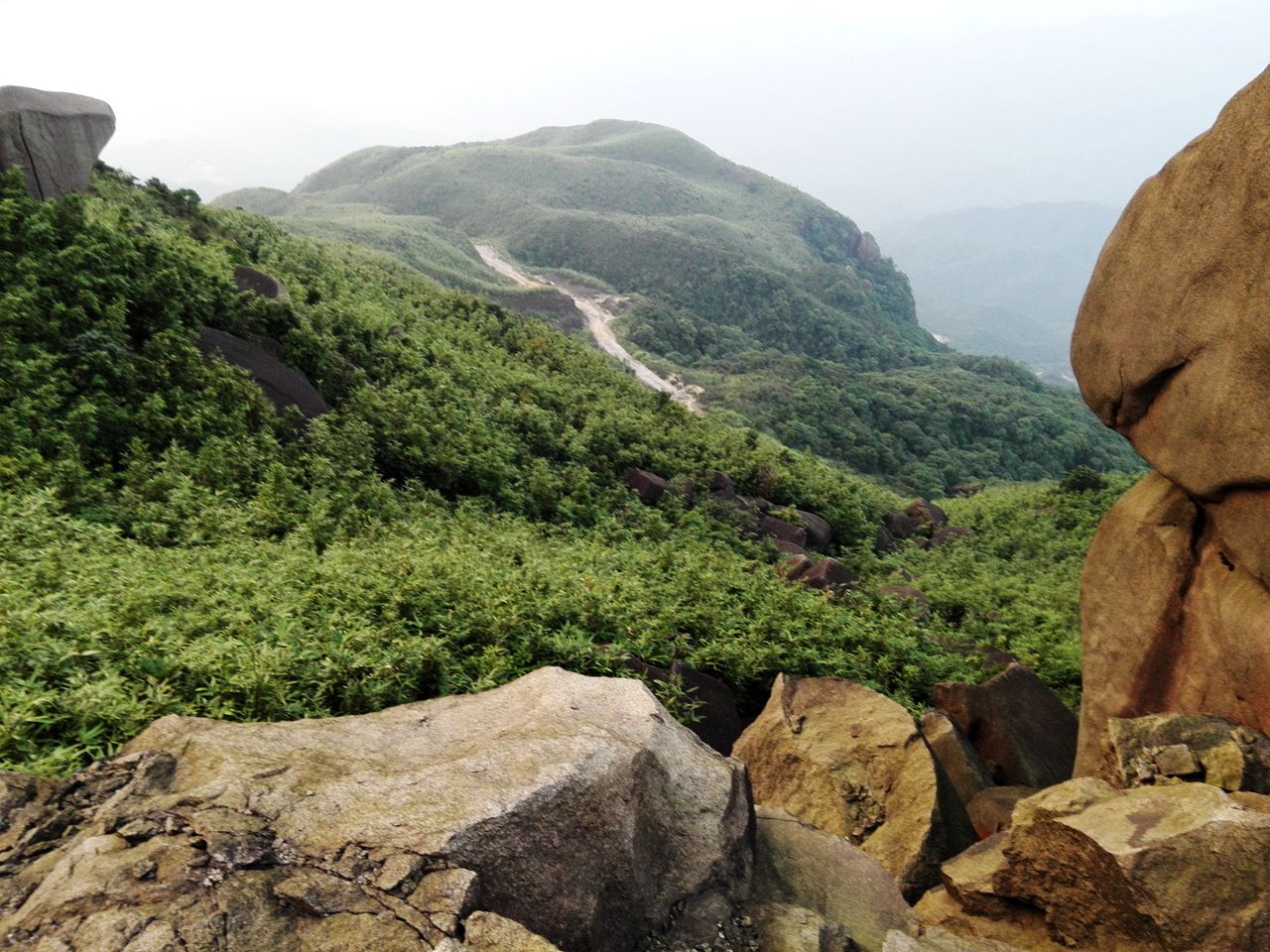
Mountain forest landscape in Maoming

== Climate ==
The climate of the ecoregion is Dry-winter humid subtropical climate (Köppen climate classification (Cwa)). This climate is characterized as having no month averaging below 0 °C (32 °F), at least one month averaging above 22 °C (72 °F), and four months averaging over 10 °C (50 °F). Precipitation in the wet summer months is ten time or more the average of the winter months. The ecoregion is mostly below 23d 30m latitude, and below the frost line. Annual rainfall in this ecoregion varies from a low of about 1,800 mm in the Red River Basin to a high of about 2,850 mm near the Chinese border, where there are only two months with less than 50 mm rainfall and no totally dry months. Temperature regimes in the north have a strong seasonality, with cool winter conditions and hot and humid summers.

== Flora and fauna ==
Tropical genera represent 80% of the flora of the ecoregion. The forests of the area are under pressure from the increase in rubber and pulp plantations, and commercial agricultural crops in the understory. As of 2012, the region supported 117 threatened species (out of a total of 1,114 species), 28 of which were endemic. Very little pristine forest remains within this ecoregion. Lowland forests growing on limestone substrates commonly reach only 15-20 m in height but grow to 30-35 m on favorable sites. Few emergent trees in most stands suggest past cutting of larger trees. Dominance is mixed among a variety of tree species, with the Lauraceae, Fagaceae and Meliaceae particularly important. This region shows strong floristic relationships with areas to the north in China, and regional endemism is high.

== See also ==
- List of ecoregions in China
