= Palawan rain forests =

Ecoregion in Palawan, the Philippines

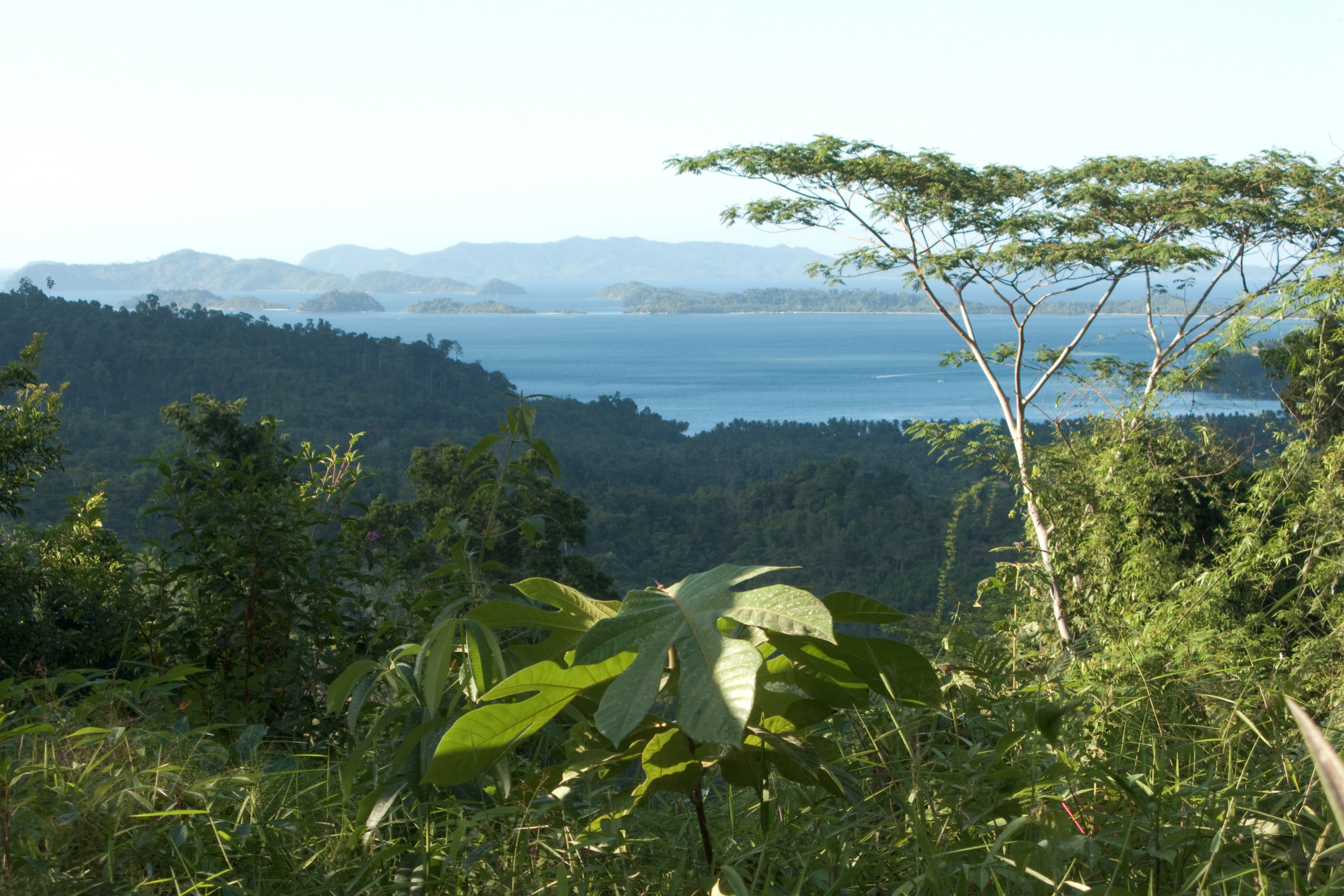
- View over northwest coast of Palawan and South China Sea

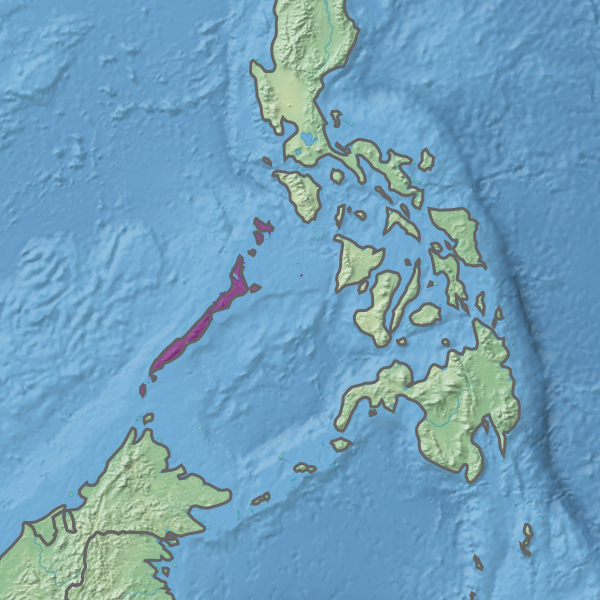
- Ecoregion territory (in purple)

Ecology
- Realm: Indomalayan
- Biome: Tropical and subtropical moist broadleaf forests

Geography
- Area: 14,369 km^{2} (5,548 sq mi)
- Country: Philippines
- Coordinates: 9.6°N 118.5°E

The Palawan rain forests ecoregion (WWF ID:IM0143) covers the Palawan Island Archipelago, centered on Palawan Island, the sixth largest island in the Philippines. The islands act as an ecological bridge between Borneo and the main islands of the Philippines, even though there were channels between the islands through the last ice age when sea levels were low. Biodiversity is high in the islands, with many endemic species, and with many genera shared with Borneo to the south. Pressure from logging is a concern for the forests of this region.

== Location and description ==
In addition to the main island of Palawan Island, the ecoregion includes Balabac Island to the south, Ursula Island, and the Calamian Islands to the north. Palawan Island is 260 km long and averages only 25–30 km wide. A mountain range runs up the middle of the island, with almost half of the slopes averaging over 30 degrees. The highest point is 2,085 metres (6,841 ft) at Mount Mantalingajan. The islands are relatively young, having been lifted up from the sea only 5-10 million years ago.

== Climate ==
The climate of the ecoregion is Tropical savanna climate - dry winter (Köppen climate classification (Aw)). This climate is characterized by relatively even temperatures throughout the year, and a pronounced dry season. The driest month has less than 60 mm of precipitation, and is drier than the average month. In the Palawans, the wet season lasts from June to October. The dry season for much of the island is November to May, but only a few months long in the north.

== Flora ==
About two thirds of the islands is covered in closed broadleaf evergreen forest, 10% in other closed forest, 15% in open forest or herbaceous cover and only about 5% in human settlement or agriculture. Much of this forest below the highlands has been cut previously, and pressure from logging and conversion of land to agriculture has reduced the quality of much of the forest. The forests nearest the coast are beech forests, transitioning to lowland rain forest dominated by trees of the Dipterocarpaceae family, Agalai, various species of Ficus, Water gum (Tristania), Broad leaved ballart (Exocarpos latifolius), and Swintonia foxworthyi. Montane rainforest is found at higher elevations (800 to 1,200 meters), and semi-deciduous forest is found in the rain shadow on the east side of the main island.

The southern part of the main island has different forest types that depend on the soil. Large areas are limestone forest, featuring cathedral cactus (Euphorbia lacei), Aglaia argentea, and species of Antidesma, Drypetes, and Gomphandra. There are ultramafic forests around Victoria Peak that support plants that may be associated with soils having heavy metals. Parts of the southern forest are dominated by Casuarina.

== Fauna ==
There are high levels of endemic species of mammals on the islands, but many of the genera are shared with Borneo, indicating that the Palawans were once part of Sundaland (the combined islands to the west), but have been separated for enough time to develop their own faunal communities.

== Protected areas ==
Over 80% of the ecoregion is protected in some form. These protected areas include:

- Puerto Princesa Subterranean River National Park
