= Sulu Archipelago rain forests =

Ecoregion in Sulu Archipelago, the Philippines

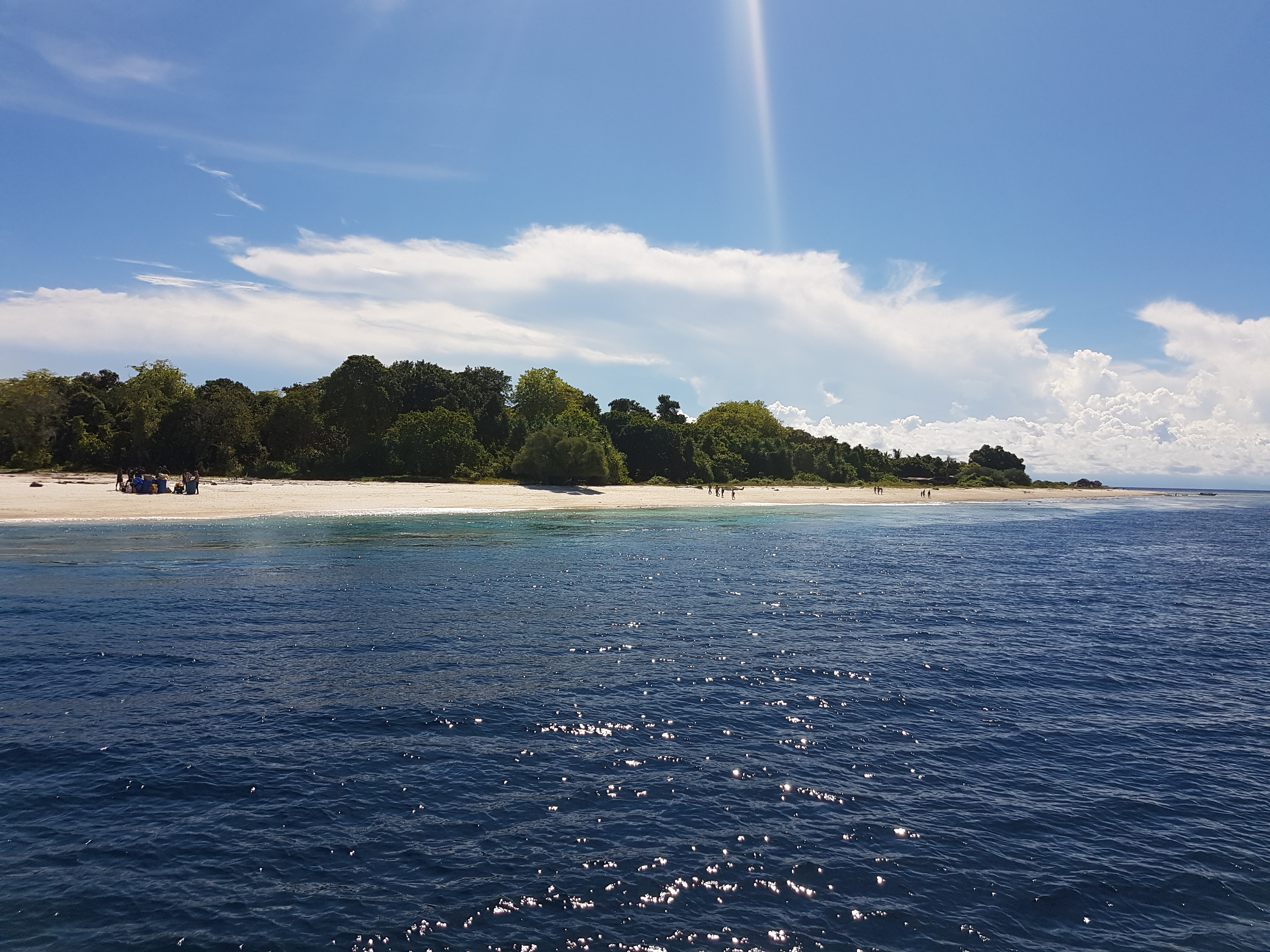
- Panguan Island, the northernmost large island in the Sulus

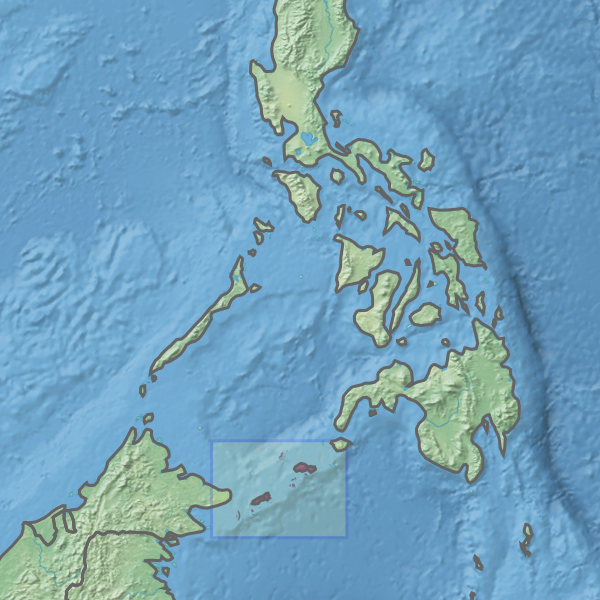
- Ecoregion territory (in purple)

Ecology
- Realm: Indomalayan
- Biome: Tropical and subtropical moist broadleaf forests

Geography
- Area: 2,341 km^{2} (904 sq mi)
- Country: Philippines
- Coordinates: 5.75°N 121.25°E

The Sulu Archipelago rain forests ecoregion (WWF ID: IM0156) covers the Sulu Archipelago, excepting Basilan Island at the northern end, in the southwest of the Philippines. The islands are separated enough from Borneo to the south and Mindanao to the north that they have developed their own distinctive floral and faunal communities. Most of the original rainforest has been removed or disturbed for agriculture, and political instability in the islands has hampered conservation efforts.

== Location and description ==
The islands are not the remains of a land bridge between Borneo and Mindanao, but rather are the product of submarine volcanoes. There are deep channels between the Sulus and the larger islands to the south and north, but the distances are not great. The current islands are low-lying and of coral limestone. The islands divide the Sulu Sea to the north from the Celebes Sea to the south. The islands are generally low lying, with the highest elevation being 664 metres (2,178 ft) above sea level. Included in the ecoregion are the islands of Sibutu, Sanga-Sanga, Tawi-Tawi, and Panguan.

== Climate ==
The climate of the ecoregion is Tropical rainforest climate (Köppen climate classification (Af)). This climate is characterized as hot, humid, and having at least 60 mm of precipitation every month.

== Flora and fauna ==
The forest types on the islands include beach forest, mangroves, and lowland tropical rainforest. The beach forests feature Barringtonia, Caesalpinia, and Terminalia. Characteristic species of the lowland rain forest include Anisoptera, Dipterocarpus, Hopea, and Shorea. Mangrove species include Rhizophora, Ceriops, Sonneratia, Avicennia, and Mangrove palm (Nypa fruticans). About 75% of the islands are covered with closed forest, mostly evergreen broadleaf, but this forest has been degraded by clearing in recent years.

Birds of conservation interest include the critically endangered Red-vented cockatoo (Cacatua haematuropygia) and the vulnerable Wincell's kingfisher (Todirhamphus winchelli).

== Protected areas ==
There are no significant protected areas in the Sulu Archipelago, although there is a small eco-tourism site covering 250 hectares on Mount Bongao.

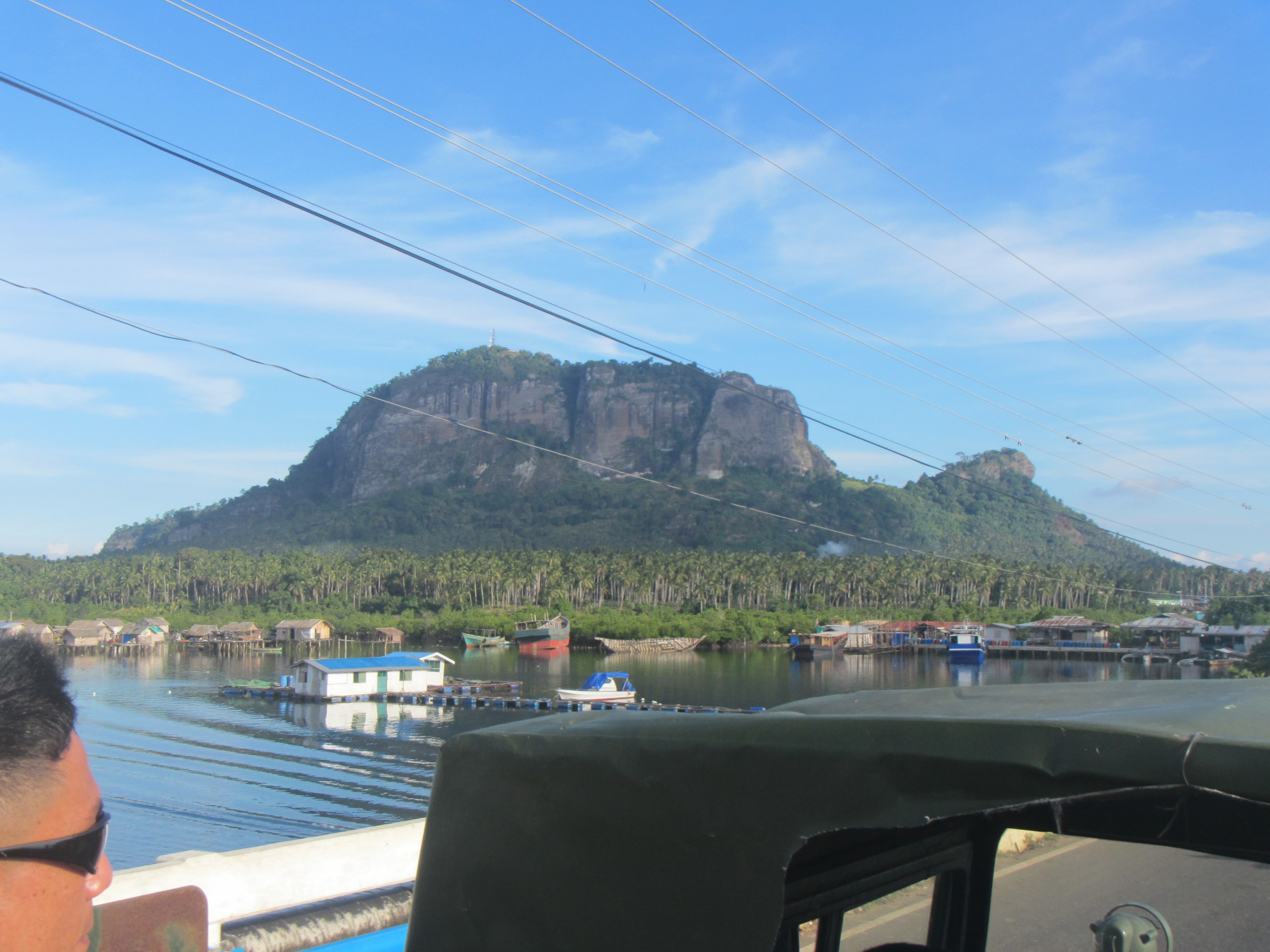
Mount Bongao, a 342 meter high mountain of limestone and rainforest on the island of Tawi-Tawi
