= Indomalayan realm =

One of Earth's eight biogeographic realms

Coordinates: 7°00′N 97°00′E

The Indomalayan realm

The Indomalayan realm is one of the eight biogeographic realms. It extends across most of South and Southeast Asia and into the southern parts of East Asia.

Also called the Oriental realm by biogeographers, Indomalaya spreads all over the Indian subcontinent and Southeast Asia to lowland southern China, and through Indonesia as far as Sumatra, Java, Bali, and Borneo, east of which lies the Wallace line, the realm boundary named after Alfred Russel Wallace which separates Indomalaya from Australasia. Indomalaya also includes the Philippines, lowland Taiwan, and Japan's Ryukyu Islands.

Most of Indomalaya was originally covered by forest, and includes tropical and subtropical moist broadleaf forests, with tropical and subtropical dry broadleaf forests predominant in much of India and parts of Southeast Asia. The tropical forests of Indomalaya are highly variable and diverse, with economically important trees, especially in the families Dipterocarpaceae, Ficus, and Fabaceae.

== Major ecological regions ==
The outlined ecoregions of the Indomalayan realm, each of a colored biome. Note that this realm has 10 of 14 biomes, or major habitat types, as defined by Olson & Dinerstein, et al. (2001).: 01. Tropical and subtropical moist broadleaf forests; 02. Tropical and subtropical dry broadleaf forests; 03. Tropical and subtropical coniferous forests; 04. Temperate broadleaf and mixed forests; 05. Temperate coniferous forests; 06. Taiga and Boreal forest; 07. Tropical and subtropical grasslands, savannas, and shrublands; 08. Temperate grasslands, savannas, and shrublands; 09. Flooded grasslands and savannas; 10. Montane grasslands and shrublands; 11. Tundra; 12. Mediterranean forests, woodlands, and scrub; 13. Deserts and xeric shrublands; 14. Mangroves; Rock and Ice, or Abiotic Land Zones

The World Wildlife Fund (WWF) divides Indomalayan realm into three bio-regions, which it defines as "geographic clusters of eco-regions that may span several habitat types, but have strong biogeographic affinities, particularly at taxonomic levels higher than the species level (genus, family)".

=== Indian subcontinent ===
The Indian subcontinent bioregion covers most of India, Bangladesh, Nepal, Bhutan, and Sri Lanka and eastern parts of Pakistan. The Hindu Kush, Karakoram, Himalaya, and Patkai ranges bound the bioregion on the northwest, north, and northeast; these ranges were formed by the collision of the northward-drifting Indian subcontinent with Asia beginning 45 million years ago. The Hindu Kush, Karakoram, and Himalaya are a major biogeographic boundary between the subtropical and tropical flora and fauna of the Indian subcontinent and the temperate-climate Palearctic realm.

=== Indochina ===
The Indochina bioregion includes most of Mainland Southeast Asia, including Myanmar, Thailand, Laos, Vietnam, and Cambodia, as well as the subtropical forests of southern China.

=== Sunda Shelf and the Philippines ===
Malesia is a botanical province which straddles the boundary between Indomalaya and Australasia. It includes the Malay Peninsula and the western Indonesian islands (known as Sundaland), the Philippines, the eastern Indonesian islands, and New Guinea. While the Malesia has much in common botanically, the portions east and west of the Wallace Line differ greatly in land animal species; Sundaland shares its fauna with mainland Asia, while terrestrial fauna on the islands east of the Wallace line are derived at least in part from species of Australian origin, such as marsupial mammals and ratite birds.

== Ecoregions ==
Indomalayan tropical and subtropical moist broadleaf forests ecoregions
Andaman Islands	India
Borneo lowland rain forests	Indonesia, Brunei, Malaysia
Borneo montane rain forests	Indonesia, Brunei, Malaysia
Borneo peat swamp forests	Indonesia, Brunei, Malaysia
Brahmaputra Valley semi-evergreen forests	Bhutan, India, Bangladesh
Cardamom Mountains rain forests	Cambodia, Thailand, Vietnam
Chao Phraya freshwater swamp forests	Thailand
Chao Phraya lowland moist deciduous forests	Thailand
Chin Hills–Arakan Yoma montane forests	Myanmar
Christmas and Cocos Islands tropical forests	Australia
Eastern Highlands moist deciduous forests	India
Eastern Java–Bali montane rain forests	Indonesia
Eastern Java–Bali rain forests	Indonesia
Greater Negros–Panay rain forests	Philippines
Hainan Island monsoon rain forests	China
Himalayan subtropical broadleaf forests	Nepal, India, Bhutan
Irrawaddy freshwater swamp forests	Myanmar
Irrawaddy moist deciduous forests	Myanmar
Jiang Nan subtropical evergreen forests	China
Kayah–Karen montane rain forests	Myanmar, Thailand
Lower Gangetic Plains moist deciduous forests	Bangladesh, India
Luang Prabang montane rain forests	Thailand, Laos
Luzon montane rain forests	Philippines
Luzon rain forests	Philippines
Malabar Coast moist forests	India
Maldives–Lakshadweep–Chagos Archipelago tropical moist forests	Maldives, India, British Indian Ocean Territory
Margalla hills	Pakistan
Meghalaya subtropical forests	India, Bangladesh
Mentawai Islands rain forests	Indonesia
Mindanao montane rain forests	Philippines
Mindanao–Eastern Visayas rain forests	Philippines
Mindoro rain forests	Philippines
Mizoram–Manipur–Kachin rain forests	India, Myanmar, Bangladesh, China
Myanmar coastal rain forests	Myanmar
Nansei Islands subtropical evergreen forests	Japan
Nicobar Islands rain forests	India
North Western Ghats moist deciduous forests	India
North Western Ghats montane rain forests	India
Northern Annamites rain forests	Laos, Vietnam
Northern Indochina subtropical forests	Thailand, Myanmar, Vietnam, Laos, China
Northern Khorat Plateau moist deciduous forests	Thailand, Laos
Northern Thailand-Laos moist deciduous forests	Thailand, Laos
Northern Triangle subtropical forests	Myanmar
Northern Vietnam lowland rain forests	Vietnam
Orissa semi-evergreen forests	India
Palawan rain forests	Philippines
Peninsular Malaysian montane rain forests	Malaysia
Peninsular Malaysian peat swamp forests	Malaysia
Peninsular Malaysian rain forests	Malaysia, Indonesia, Singapore, Thailand
Red River freshwater swamp forests	Vietnam
South China Sea Islands	Philippines, China, Malaysia, Taiwan, Brunei, Vietnam
South China–Vietnam subtropical evergreen forests	China, Vietnam
South Taiwan monsoon rain forests	Taiwan
South Western Ghats moist deciduous forests	India
South Western Ghats montane rain forests	India
Southern Annamites montane rain forests	Vietnam, Laos, Cambodia
Southwest Borneo freshwater swamp forests	Indonesia, Malaysia
Sri Lanka lowland rain forests	Sri Lanka
Sri Lanka montane rain forests	Sri Lanka
Sulu Archipelago rain forests	Philippines
Sumatran freshwater swamp forests	Indonesia
Sumatran lowland rain forests	Indonesia
Sumatran montane rain forests	Indonesia
Sumatran peat swamp forests	Indonesia
Sundaland heath forests	Indonesia, Brunei, Malaysia
Sundarbans freshwater swamp forests	Bangladesh, India
Taiwan subtropical evergreen forests	Taiwan
Tenasserim–South Thailand semi-evergreen rain forests	Myanmar, Thailand, Malaysia
Tonle Sap freshwater swamp forests	Cambodia
Tonle Sap–Mekong peat swamp forests	Cambodia, Vietnam
Upper Gangetic Plains moist deciduous forests	India, Nepal
Western Java montane rain forests	Indonesia
Western Java rain forests	Indonesia

Indomalayan tropical and subtropical dry broadleaf forest ecoregions
Central Deccan Plateau dry deciduous forests	India
Central Indochina dry forests	Cambodia, Thailand, Laos, Vietnam, Myanmar
Chota-Nagpur dry deciduous forests	India
East Deccan dry evergreen forests	India
Irrawaddy dry forests	Myanmar
Khathiar–Gir dry deciduous forests	India
Narmada Valley dry deciduous forests	India
Northern dry deciduous forests	India
South Deccan Plateau dry deciduous forests	India
Southeastern Indochina dry evergreen forests	Cambodia, Laos, Thailand, Vietnam
Southern Vietnam lowland dry forests	Vietnam
Sri Lanka dry-zone dry evergreen forests	Sri Lanka

Indomalayan tropical and subtropical coniferous forest ecoregions
Himalayan subtropical pine forests	India, Pakistan, Nepal, Bhutan
Luzon tropical pine forests	Philippines
Northeast India–Myanmar pine forests	India, Myanmar
Sumatran tropical pine forests	Indonesia

Indomalayan tropical and subtropical grasslands, savannas, and shrublands ecoregions
Terai–Duar savanna and grasslands	India, Nepal

Indomalayan tropical and subtropical grasslands, savannas, and shrublands ecoregions
Eastern Himalayan subalpine conifer forests	India, Nepal, Bhutan, Myanmar
Western Himalayan subalpine conifer forests	Pakistan, India, Nepal

Indomalayan temperate broadleaf and mixed forests ecoregions
Eastern Himalayan broadleaf forests	India, Nepal, Bhutan, Myanmar, China
Northern Triangle temperate forests	Myanmar
Western Himalayan broadleaf forests	India, Pakistan, Nepal

Indomalayan tropical and subtropical grasslands, savannas, and shrublands ecoregions
Godavari–Krishna mangroves	India
Indochina mangroves	Thailand, Cambodia, Vietnam, Malaysia
Indus River Delta–Arabian Sea mangroves	Pakistan, India
Myanmar coast mangroves	Myanmar, Thailand, Malaysia, Bangladesh
Sunda Shelf mangroves	Malaysia, Indonesia
Sundarbans	Bangladesh, India

Indomalayan flooded grasslands and savannas ecoregions
Rann of Kutch seasonal salt marsh	India, Pakistan

Indomalayan tropical and subtropical grasslands, savannas, and shrublands ecoregions
Deccan thorn scrub forests	India
Indus Valley Desert	Pakistan
Northwestern thorn scrub forests	Pakistan, India
Thar Desert	India, Pakistan

== History ==
The flora of Indomalaya blends elements from the ancient supercontinents of Laurasia and Gondwana. Gondwanian elements were first introduced by India, which detached from Gondwana approximately 90 MYA, carrying its Gondwana-derived flora and fauna northward, which included cichlid fish and the plant families Crypteroniaceae and possibly Dipterocarpaceae. India collided with Asia 30-45 MYA, and exchanged species. Later, as Australia-New Guinea drifted north, the collision of the Australian and Asian plates pushed up the islands of Wallacea, which were separated from one another by narrow straits, allowing a botanic exchange between Indomalaya and Australasia. Asian rainforest flora, including the dipterocarps, island-hopped across Wallacea to New Guinea, and several Gondwanian plant families, including podocarps and araucarias, moved westward from Australia-New Guinea into western Malesia and Southeast Asia.

== Flora ==
The subfamily Dipterocarpoideae comprises characteristic tree species in Indomalaya's moist and seasonally dry forests, with the greatest species diversity in the moist forests of Borneo. Teak (Tectona) is characteristic of the seasonally dry forests of the Indomalaya, from India through Indochina, Malaysia, and the Philippines. The genus Ficus is common throughout the realm, notably in moist forests. Tropical pitcher plants (Nepenthes) are also characteristic of Indomalaya, and the greatest diversity of species is in Sumatra, Borneo, and the Philippines.

The tropical forests of Indomalaya and Australasia share many lineages of plants, which have managed over millions of years to disperse across the straits and islands between Sundaland and New Guinea. The two floras evolved in long isolation, and the fossil record suggests that Asian species dispersed to Australasia starting 33 million years ago as Australasia moved northwards, and dispersal increased 12 million years ago as the two continents approached their present positions. The exchange was asymmetric, with more Indomalayan species spreading to Australasia than Australasian species to Indomalaya.

== Fauna ==
Two orders of mammals, the colugos (Dermoptera) and treeshrews (Scandentia), are endemic to the realm, as are families Craseonycteridae (Kitti's hog-nosed bat), Diatomyidae, Platacanthomyidae, Tarsiidae (tarsiers) and Hylobatidae (gibbons). Large mammals characteristic of Indomalaya include the leopard, tigers, water buffalos, Asian elephant, Indian rhinoceros, Javan rhinoceros, Malayan tapir, orangutans, and gibbons.

Indomalaya has three endemic bird families, the Irenidae (fairy bluebirds), Megalaimidae and Rhabdornithidae (Philippine creepers). Also characteristic are pheasants, sunbirds, pittas, Old World babblers, and flowerpeckers.

Indomalaya has 1000 species of amphibians in 81 genera, about 17 of global species. 800 Indomalayan species, or 80%, are endemic. Indomalaya has three endemic families of amphibians, Nasikabatrachidae, Ichthyophiidae, and Uraeotyphlidae. 329, or 33%, of Indomalayan amphibians are considered threatened or extinct, with habitat loss as the principal cause.

More information is available under Indomalayan realm fauna.

== See also ==
- Ecoregions in Indonesia
- Ecoregions in Pakistan
- Ecoregions of India
- Ecoregions of the Philippines
- Mainland Southeast Asia (the Indochinese Peninsula)
- Malesia – Biogeographical region in Southeast Asia
- Sundaland – Biogeographic region of Southeast Asia

== Bibliography ==
- Wikramanayake, E., E. Dinerstein, C. J. Loucks, D. M. Olson, J. Morrison, J. L. Lamoreux, M. McKnight, and P. Hedao. 2002. Terrestrial ecoregions of the Indo-Pacific: a conservation assessment. Island Press, Washington, DC, USA, .

Indomalayan tropical and subtropical moist broadleaf forests ecoregions
Andaman Islands	India
Borneo lowland rain forests	Indonesia, Brunei, Malaysia
Borneo montane rain forests	Indonesia, Brunei, Malaysia
Borneo peat swamp forests	Indonesia, Brunei, Malaysia
Brahmaputra Valley semi-evergreen forests	Bhutan, India, Bangladesh
Cardamom Mountains rain forests	Cambodia, Thailand, Vietnam
Chao Phraya freshwater swamp forests	Thailand
Chao Phraya lowland moist deciduous forests	Thailand
Chin Hills–Arakan Yoma montane forests	Myanmar
Christmas and Cocos Islands tropical forests	Australia
Eastern Highlands moist deciduous forests	India
Eastern Java–Bali montane rain forests	Indonesia
Eastern Java–Bali rain forests	Indonesia
Greater Negros–Panay rain forests	Philippines
Hainan Island monsoon rain forests	China
Himalayan subtropical broadleaf forests	Nepal, India, Bhutan
Irrawaddy freshwater swamp forests	Myanmar
Irrawaddy moist deciduous forests	Myanmar
Jiang Nan subtropical evergreen forests	China
Kayah–Karen montane rain forests	Myanmar, Thailand
Lower Gangetic Plains moist deciduous forests	Bangladesh, India
Luang Prabang montane rain forests	Thailand, Laos
Luzon montane rain forests	Philippines
Luzon rain forests	Philippines
Malabar Coast moist forests	India
Maldives–Lakshadweep–Chagos Archipelago tropical moist forests	Maldives, India, British Indian Ocean Territory
Margalla hills	Pakistan
Meghalaya subtropical forests	India, Bangladesh
Mentawai Islands rain forests	Indonesia
Mindanao montane rain forests	Philippines
Mindanao–Eastern Visayas rain forests	Philippines
Mindoro rain forests	Philippines
Mizoram–Manipur–Kachin rain forests	India, Myanmar, Bangladesh, China
Myanmar coastal rain forests	Myanmar
Nansei Islands subtropical evergreen forests	Japan
Nicobar Islands rain forests	India
North Western Ghats moist deciduous forests	India
North Western Ghats montane rain forests	India
Northern Annamites rain forests	Laos, Vietnam
Northern Indochina subtropical forests	Thailand, Myanmar, Vietnam, Laos, China
Northern Khorat Plateau moist deciduous forests	Thailand, Laos
Northern Thailand-Laos moist deciduous forests	Thailand, Laos
Northern Triangle subtropical forests	Myanmar
Northern Vietnam lowland rain forests	Vietnam
Orissa semi-evergreen forests	India
Palawan rain forests	Philippines
Peninsular Malaysian montane rain forests	Malaysia
Peninsular Malaysian peat swamp forests	Malaysia
Peninsular Malaysian rain forests	Malaysia, Indonesia, Singapore, Thailand
Red River freshwater swamp forests	Vietnam
South China Sea Islands	Philippines, China, Malaysia, Taiwan, Brunei, Vietnam
South China–Vietnam subtropical evergreen forests	China, Vietnam
South Taiwan monsoon rain forests	Taiwan
South Western Ghats moist deciduous forests	India
South Western Ghats montane rain forests	India
Southern Annamites montane rain forests	Vietnam, Laos, Cambodia
Southwest Borneo freshwater swamp forests	Indonesia, Malaysia
Sri Lanka lowland rain forests	Sri Lanka
Sri Lanka montane rain forests	Sri Lanka
Sulu Archipelago rain forests	Philippines
Sumatran freshwater swamp forests	Indonesia
Sumatran lowland rain forests	Indonesia
Sumatran montane rain forests	Indonesia
Sumatran peat swamp forests	Indonesia
Sundaland heath forests	Indonesia, Brunei, Malaysia
Sundarbans freshwater swamp forests	Bangladesh, India
Taiwan subtropical evergreen forests	Taiwan
Tenasserim–South Thailand semi-evergreen rain forests	Myanmar, Thailand, Malaysia
Tonle Sap freshwater swamp forests	Cambodia
Tonle Sap–Mekong peat swamp forests	Cambodia, Vietnam
Upper Gangetic Plains moist deciduous forests	India, Nepal
Western Java montane rain forests	Indonesia
Western Java rain forests	Indonesia

Indomalayan tropical and subtropical dry broadleaf forest ecoregions
Central Deccan Plateau dry deciduous forests	India
Central Indochina dry forests	Cambodia, Thailand, Laos, Vietnam, Myanmar
Chota-Nagpur dry deciduous forests	India
East Deccan dry evergreen forests	India
Irrawaddy dry forests	Myanmar
Khathiar–Gir dry deciduous forests	India
Narmada Valley dry deciduous forests	India
Northern dry deciduous forests	India
South Deccan Plateau dry deciduous forests	India
Southeastern Indochina dry evergreen forests	Cambodia, Laos, Thailand, Vietnam
Southern Vietnam lowland dry forests	Vietnam
Sri Lanka dry-zone dry evergreen forests	Sri Lanka

Indomalayan tropical and subtropical coniferous forest ecoregions
Himalayan subtropical pine forests	India, Pakistan, Nepal, Bhutan
Luzon tropical pine forests	Philippines
Northeast India–Myanmar pine forests	India, Myanmar
Sumatran tropical pine forests	Indonesia

Indomalayan tropical and subtropical grasslands, savannas, and shrublands ecoregions
Eastern Himalayan subalpine conifer forests	India, Nepal, Bhutan, Myanmar
Western Himalayan subalpine conifer forests	Pakistan, India, Nepal

Indomalayan tropical and subtropical grasslands, savannas, and shrublands ecoregions
Terai–Duar savanna and grasslands	India, Nepal

Indomalayan flooded grasslands and savannas ecoregions
Rann of Kutch seasonal salt marsh	India, Pakistan

Indomalayan tropical and subtropical grasslands, savannas, and shrublands ecoregions
Deccan thorn scrub forests	India
Indus Valley Desert	Pakistan
Northwestern thorn scrub forests	Pakistan, India
Thar Desert	India, Pakistan

Indomalayan tropical and subtropical grasslands, savannas, and shrublands ecoregions
Godavari–Krishna mangroves	India
Indochina mangroves	Thailand, Cambodia, Vietnam, Malaysia
Indus River Delta–Arabian Sea mangroves	Pakistan, India
Myanmar coast mangroves	Myanmar, Thailand, Malaysia, Bangladesh
Sunda Shelf mangroves	Malaysia, Indonesia
Sundarbans	Bangladesh, India
