= Northern Vietnam lowland rain forests =

Ecoregion in Northern Vietnam

Ecoregion: Northern Vietnam lowland rain forests
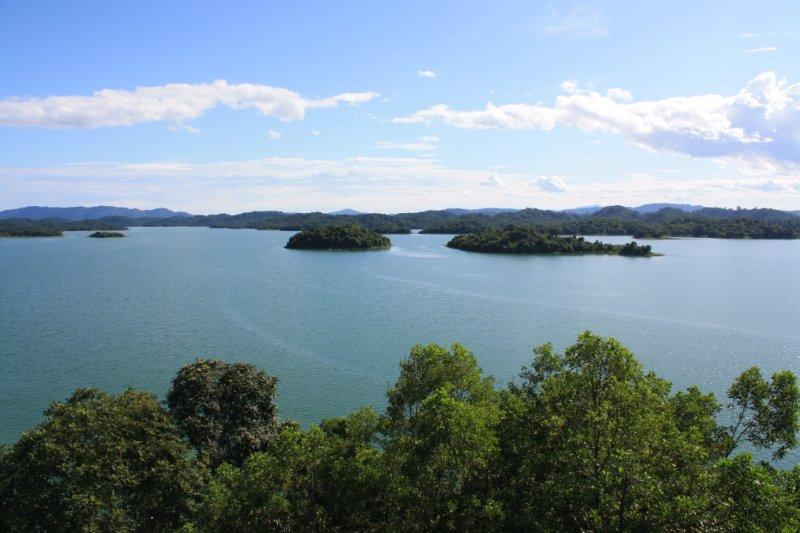
- Lake Song Muc in Ben En National Park

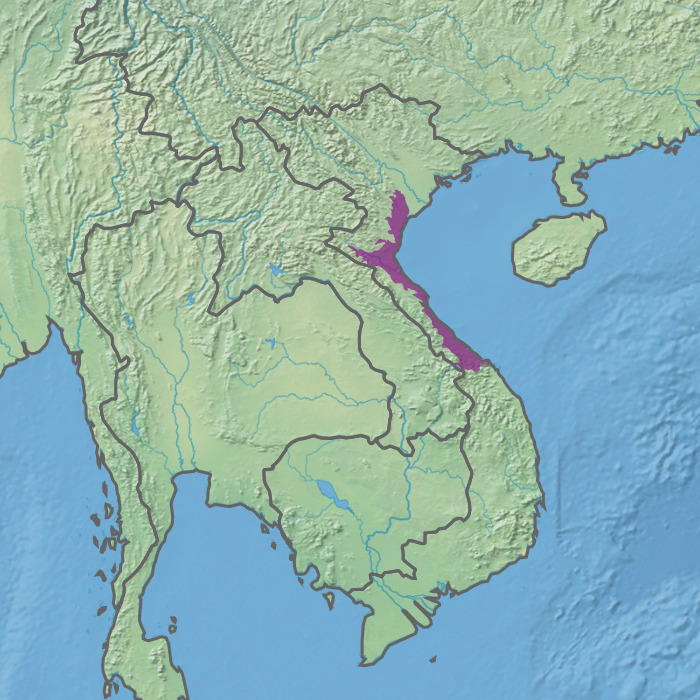
- Ecoregion territory (in purple)

Ecology
- Realm: Indomalayan
- Biome: Tropical and subtropical moist broadleaf forests

Geography
- Area: 22,532 km^{2} (8,700 mi^{2})
- Country: Vietnam; Laos
- Coordinates: 19°N 105°E

The Northern Vietnam lowland rain forests ecoregion (WWF ID: IM0141) covers the central-eastern coast of Vietnam from the Red River delta in the north to Tam Kỳ in the center of the country and neighboring adjacent parts of Laos. The region is one of the wet evergreen forests, with rain over 50 mm in every month. The forests have been highly degraded by human use, and the high levels of biodiversity have been pushed back into relatively small protected areas like Pu Mat National Park.

== Location and description ==
The region is about 380 km from north to south, and about 50 km wide on average. It is bounded by the coast on the east, and the Northern Annamites rain forests to the west. The geological base features extensive limestone ('karst') mountains and valleys. Elevations range from sea level to 1,000 meters, with an average of 88 meters. The primary wet evergreen forest has mostly been cleared in the past by humans; by one estimate only 10% of the original remains.

== Climate ==
The climate of the ecoregion borders the humid subtropical and seasonal tropical forest climate zones (Köppen climate classification (Aw and Cwa)). Annual rainfall increases towards the south, averaging 1,500 mm in the north near Hanoi, and reaching 3,000 mm in the south near Huế. The wet seasons are typically September to January.

== Flora and fauna ==
The original wet evergreen forest has been mostly broken up by human agriculture and use, and now exists in scattered patches. Over the ecoregion as a whole, only 28% is currently under forest cover; 31% is under agricultural cultivation. The primary forest that exists exhibits a three-tiered canopy rising 25–35 meters, but emergents can grow up to 45 meters. The highest tier is dominated by trees of the Hopea genus, Castanopsis hystrix and Madhuca pasquieri. A common sub-canopy tree is the Taraw palm (Livistona saribus), used for thatching on huts.

The tree Leoheo domatiophorus is endemic to the ecoregion. It is native to Huế, Quang Tri and Quang Nam provinces, where it typically grows at the edges of primary and secondary forests.

The ecoregion supports some rare animals, including the largest viable population of the critically endangered Northern white-cheeked gibbon (living in Pu Mat National Park), the critically endangered Red-shanked douc, and populations of Gray langurs (a genus of Old World monkey).

== Protected areas ==
Officially protected areas in the ecoregion include:

- Cúc Phương National Park, at the northern end of the region was Vietnam's first national park and still its largest nature reserve.
- Pu Mat National Park, a rugged and remote area of great biodiversity (2,461 plant species identified) on the east slope of the northern Annamite Range.
- Bến En National Park, in the north, is popular with tourists for it large lake (), caves and nature trails.
- Bạch Mã National Park, sitting on steep slopes of granite mountains (to 1,250 meters) near Huế, Bach Ma is in the transition zone between northern and southern Vietnam plant communities.
