= Northern Annamites rain forests =

Ecoregion in the Annamites Range

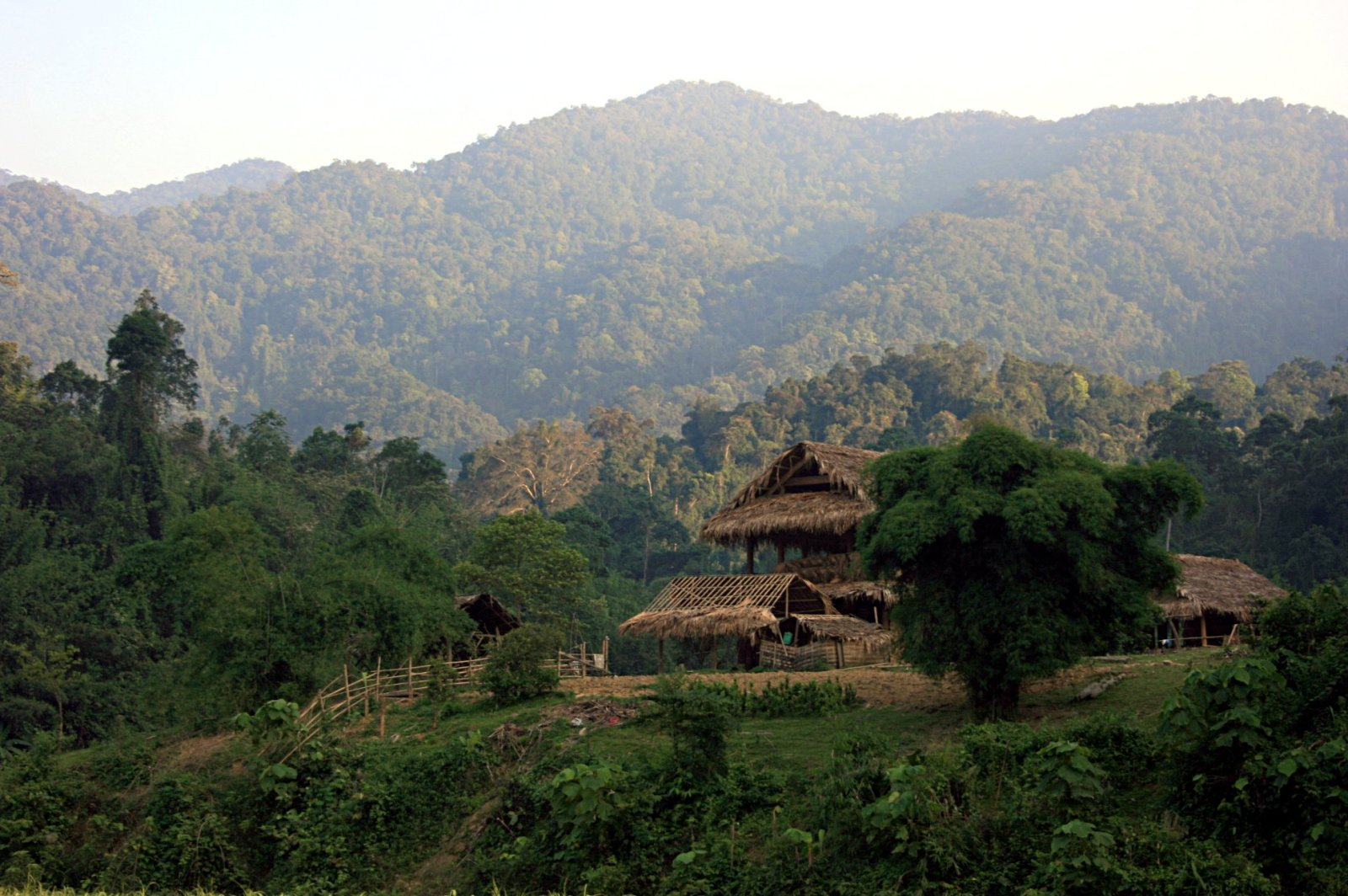
- Pù Mát National Park in the Annamite Range

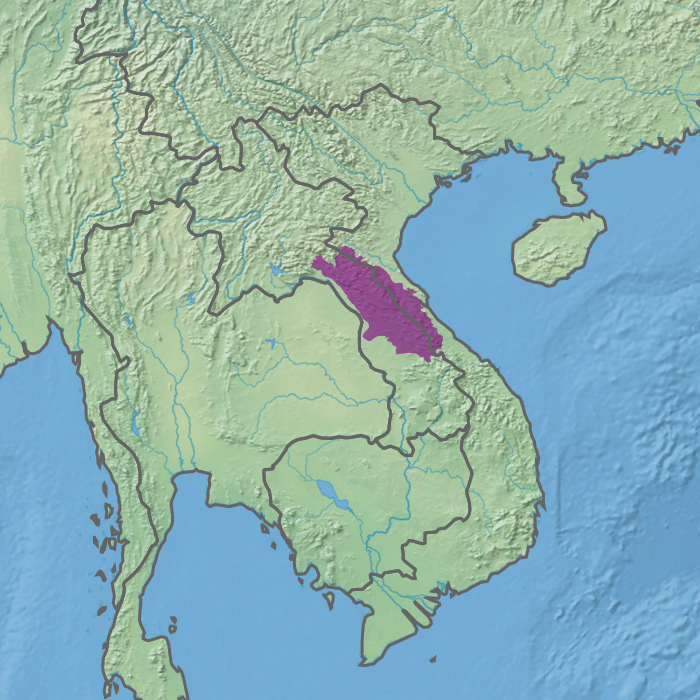
- Ecoregion territory (in purple)

Ecology
- Realm: Indomalayan
- Biome: Tropical and subtropical moist broadleaf forests

Geography
- Area: 47,137 km^{2} (18,200 mi^{2})
- Country: Laos, Vietnam
- Coordinates: 18°N 105°E

Conservation
- Protected: 33.375%

The Northern Annamites rain forests ecoregion (WWF ID: IM0136) covers the rugged and relatively unexplored northern Annamite Mountains of central Laos and Vietnam. There are high numbers of endemic plant species, and the relative remoteness and isolation of the area supports many rare and endangered animals. Rainfall is somewhat less than the lowland rainforest of the lower elevations in Vietnam, and the temperatures slightly cooler due to the higher elevation.

== Location and description ==
Most of the ecoregion is in central Laos, with a small portion on the eastern edge of the higher ridge of Annamite Range in Vietnam. The region is about 350 km long, and is at most about 150 km wide. Mean elevation is 453 metres (1,486 ft), with a highest point of 2,158 metres (7,080 ft). Human density is relatively low due to the steep slopes and high elevations.

== Climate ==
The climate of the ecoregion is Dry-winter humid subtropical climate (Köppen climate classification (Cwa)). This climate is characterized as having no month averaging below 0 °C (32 °F), at least 1 month averaging above 22 °C (72 °F), and four months averaging over 10 °C (50 °F). Precipitation in the wet summer months is ten time or more the average of the winter months. Precipitation in the ecoregion varies from 1,500-2,500 mm/year.

== Flora ==
About 75% of the region is forested (about 35,000 km^{2}), most of which is broadleaf evergreen closed forest. Lower montane forests, from 800 to 1,200 meters elevation, are dominated by broadleaf evergreen trees, including myrtles (Myrtaceae), oaks, Castanopsis, and Lithocarpus (Fagaceae), Elaeocarpaceae, and laurels (Lauraceae). Coniferous podocarps are also present. The trees form a dense two-tiered canopy 15 to 25 meters tall. Epiphytes, particularly orchids, grow abundantly on the trees, and include many endemic species of orchids. Understory vegetation is typically sparse in undisturbed forest. Thickets of bamboo, including species of Chimonobambusa and Dendrocalamus, grow in disturbed areas where the forest canopy is more open.

Pine forests grow in drier areas and areas with thin or rocky soils up to 1,500 meters elevation. Khasi pine (Pinus kesiya) is the dominant species, and can grow 20 to 30 meters tall. Associated broadleaf trees include the conifer Keteleeria evelyniana and the broadleaf trees Lyonia ovalifolia, Schima wallichii, and Tristaniopsis merguensis. The pine forests are prone to frequent fires, which help prevent the establishment of broadleaf canopy trees.

Open-canopied forests dominated by Keteleeria evelyniana are found in northern Laos. Keteleeria can grow up to thirty five metres in height, and occurs in pure stands or mixed with Pinus kesiya and oaks.

Upper montane forests, from 1,200 to 1,800 meters elevation with a cool moist character, are dominated by conifers, including Fujian cypress (Fokienia hodginsii), Dacrycarpus imbricatus, and Cunninghamia lanceolata, a type of cypress. Fokienia trees can reach 40 to 50 meters tall.

== Fauna ==
Over 134 mammal species have been identified in the ecoregion, many endemic or vulnerable, including the endangered Douc langur (a type of monkey despite the name), the vulnerable Indian bison (Bos gaurus), and the vulnerable Sumatran serow (Capricornis sumatraensis). The saola (Pseudoryx nghetinhensis) is endemic to the ecoregion, and the giant muntjac (Megamuntiacus vuquangensis) lives here and in the Southern Annamites montane rain forests.

An estimated 525 species of bird are found in the ecoregion.

== Protected areas ==
33.375% of the ecoregion is in protected areas. Officially protected areas in the ecoregion include:

- Pù Mát National Park, meaning "high slope", Pu Mat has exceptionally high biodiversity (2,461 identified plant species), and supports five mammals endemic to the Indochina. North central Vietnam. (911 km2)
- Nam Kading National Protected Area, a remote and rugged mountainous area with almost no human habitation. Central Laos. (1,690 km2)
- Phou Xang He National Protected Area, an mountainous area of mixed deciduous and dry dipterocarp forests, with many endemic and vulnerable mammal and bird species. Central Laos. (1,060 km2).
- Nakai–Nam Theun National Biodiversity Conservation Area (NBCA), one of the largest and last remaining wilderness areas in southeast Asia. Annamite Range and the adjacent Nakai Plateau. (3,445 km2).
- Phou Hin Poun National Biodiversity Conservation Area, a region of limestone mountains (karst topography in Laos. (1,801 km2)
- Hin Namno National Park. Protects 934.73 km^{2} in east-central Laos, including areas of mixed evergreen forest and limestone karst forest.
