= Tonle Sap freshwater swamp forests =

Ecoregion in Cambodia and Southern Vietnam

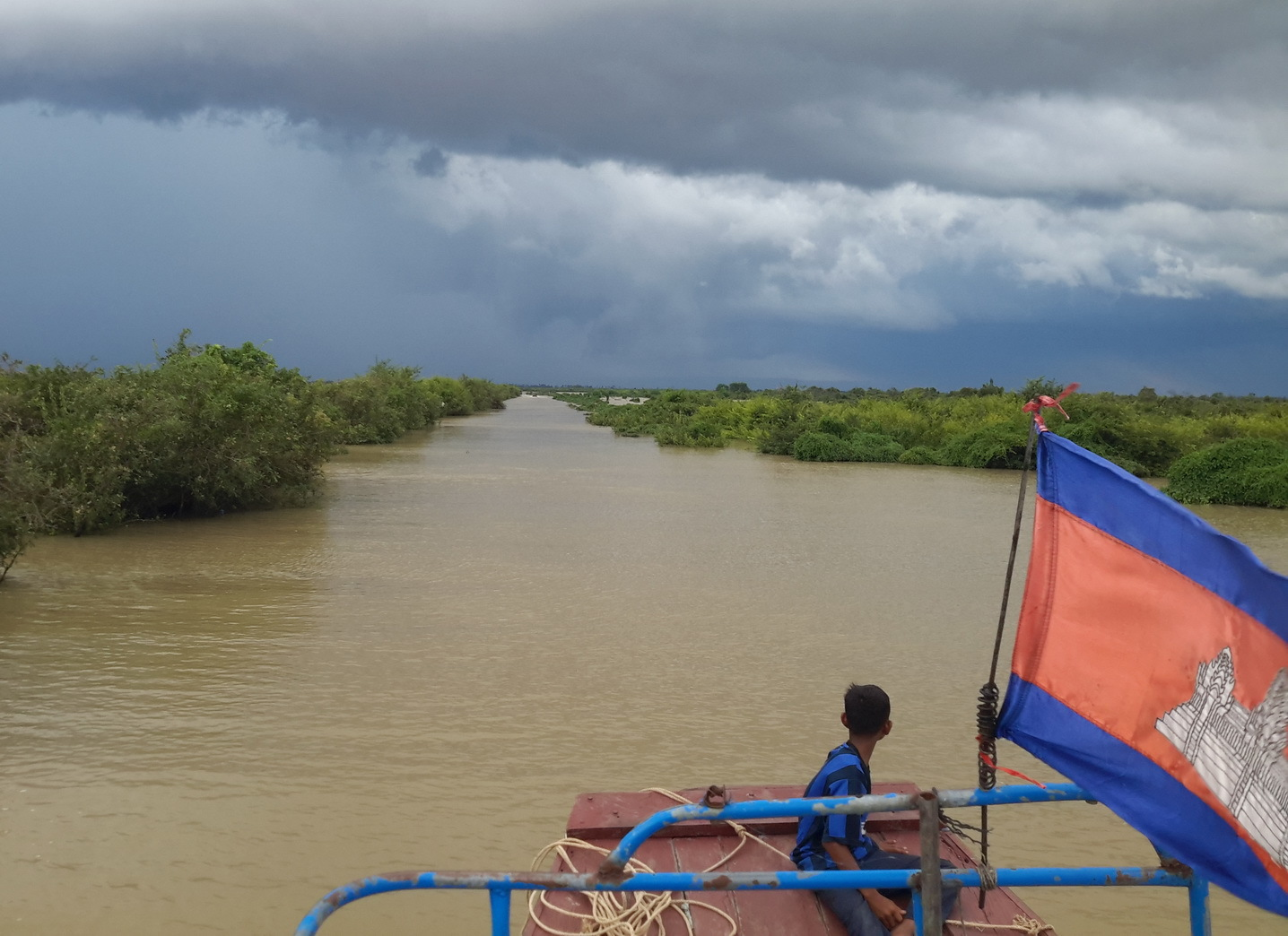
- On Tonle Sap Lake before rain

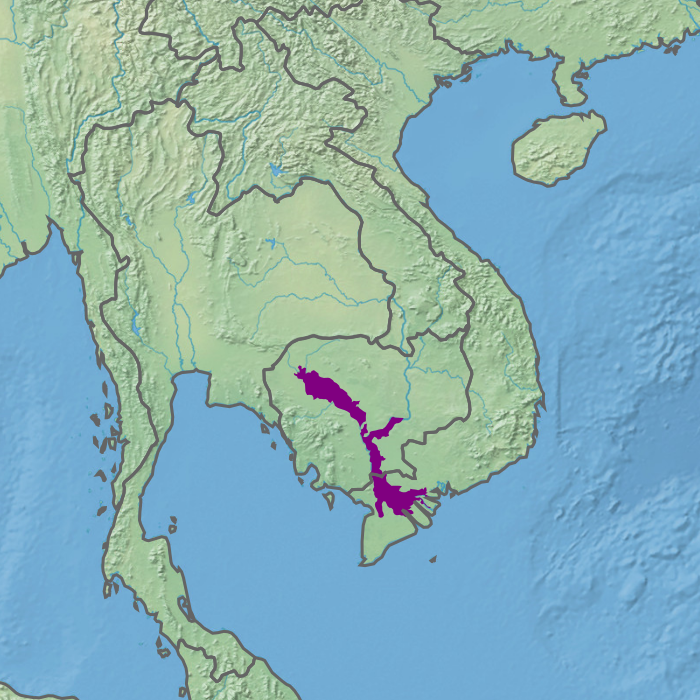
- Ecoregion territory (in purple)

Ecology
- Realm: Indomalayan
- Biome: Tropical and subtropical moist broadleaf forests

Geography
- Area: 25,900 km^{2} (10,000 sq mi)
- Country: Cambodia, Vietnam
- Coordinates: 12.4°N 104.6°E

The Tonle Sap freshwater swamp forests ecoregion (WWF ID: IM0164) covers the seasonally flooded forests surrounding Tonlé Sap, the largest lake in Cambodia, and the floodplains of its connections to the Mekong River . Over 35% of the ecoregion experiences flooding during the wet season (August – January).

== Location and description ==
The ecoregion stretches about 400 km from the northern wetlands of Tonle Sap Lake to the salt-water affected mangroves of the Mekong River Delta. The region follows the boundaries of the floodplain of the lake and the Tonle Sap River. The region is flat, although a few hills rise to 300 meters.

== Climate ==
The climate of the ecoregion is Tropical savanna climate - dry winter (Köppen climate classification (Aw)). This climate is characterized by relatively even temperatures throughout the year, and a pronounced dry season. The driest month has less than 60 mm of precipitation, and is drier than the average month.

== Flora and fauna ==
Half of the ecoregion is in use for agriculture. About 20% is forested, mostly in deciduous trees due to the seasonal flooding. Two types of forests are associated with the Tonle Sap floodplains: a stunted swamp forest around the lake (about 10% of the area), and a short tree shrubland for the larger outlying areas.

The swamp forest reaches 7–15 meters in height, but the tall trees tend to be spaced out with floating aquatic vegetation in between. Characteristic trees in this swamp forest are Barringtonia acutangula (sometimes called the 'freshwater mangrove') and Diospyros camboniana.

The shrubland is dominated by spurge plants (genus Euphorbiaceae), trees of the legume family (genus Fabaceae), and trees of the white mangrove family (genus Combretaceae).

== Protected areas ==
12% of the ecoregion is listed as being within an officially protected area, although historically the protections have been weak.

- Tonlé Sap Biosphere Reserve, a UNESCO Biosphere Reserve surrounding the "great lake".
- Prek Toal, a bird sanctuary and tourist site at the north end of the lake.
- Boeng Tonle Chhmar, a state-owned multi-use nature sanctuary in the middle reaches of the lake.
