= Indochina mangroves =

Ecoregion in Southeast Asia

Ecoregion: Indochina mangroves
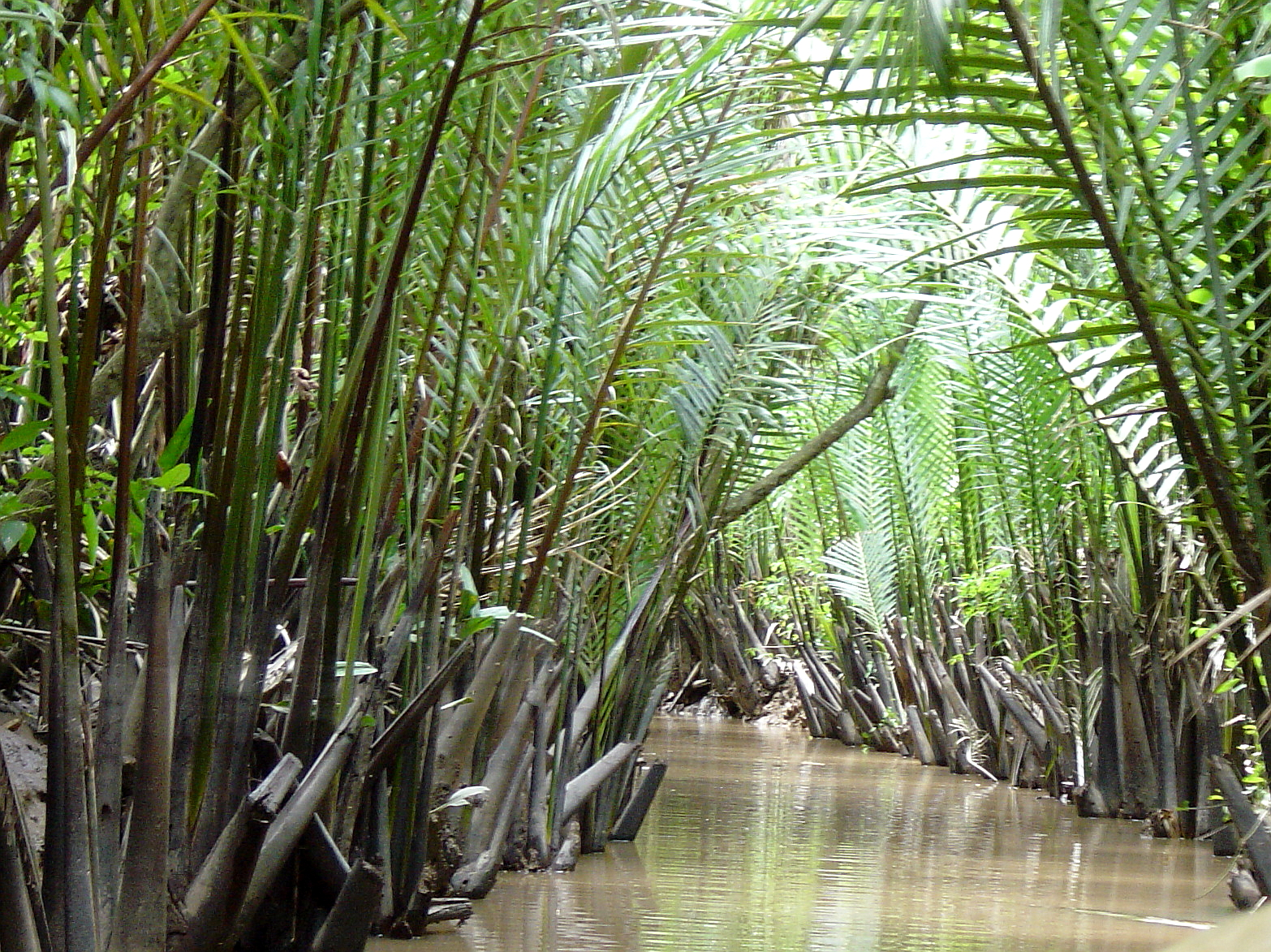
- Nypa fruticans in the delta of Mekong

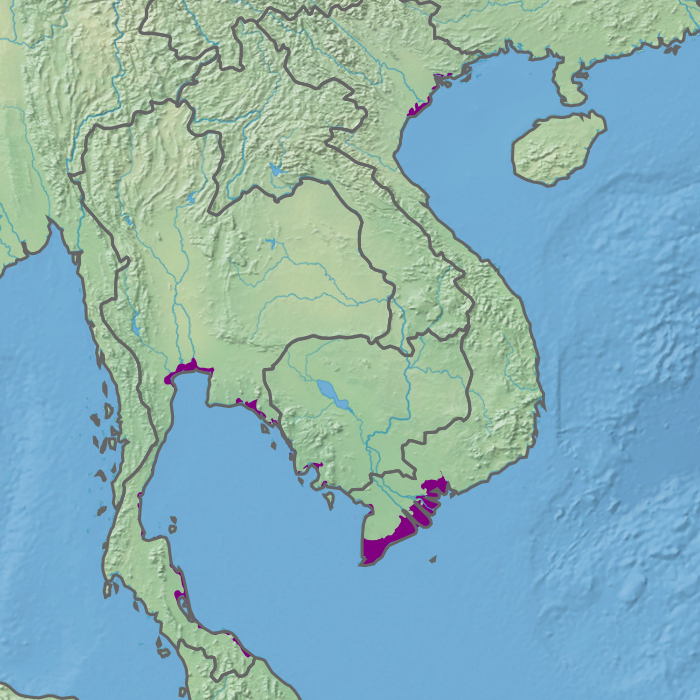
- Ecoregion territory (in purple)

Ecology
- Realm: Indomalayan
- Biome: Mangrove

Geography
- Area: 26,936 km^{2} (10,400 sq mi)
- Country: Vietnam, Thailand, Cambodia, Malaysia
- Coordinates: 10°N 106.25°E

The Indochina mangroves are a large mangrove ecoregion on the coasts of Thailand, Cambodia, Vietnam and Malaysia in Southeast Asia.

== Location and description ==
Mangrove forests occur on coasts that are regularly washed with saltwater by tidal movements. There are patches of mangrove throughout the region and there were once much more. Today the largest areas remain in the Mekong delta in U Minh district and other parts of Cà Mau province at the southern tip of Vietnam. There are smaller patches in Vietnam in Cam Ranh Bay in the south and in the Red River delta in the north. Much larger areas of mangrove habitat on the coasts of southern Vietnam including the Mekong and Red River deltas were affected by the Vietnam War when areas of mangrove were cleared or destroyed by bombing and the defoliant Agent Orange, while mangroves around Pattaya and in the Chao Phraya delta in Thailand and the Bay of Kompong Som in Cambodia have been cleared for agricultural and coastal development.

== Flora ==
The Indochina mangroves contain a diverse number of trees and other plants which vary according to proximity to the coast with the coastline trees being mainly Avicennia alba and the inland belt behind them, where the water is less salty consisting of Rhizophora apiculata and Bruguiera parviflora.

== Fauna ==
The remaining mangroves are important habitat for much wildlife, especially waterbirds such as lesser adjutant (Leptoptilos javanicus), white-winged wood duck (Cairina scutulata) and spot-billed pelican (Pelicanus philippensis). Mammals of the mangroves include the tiger (Panthera tigris), the large Malayan tapir (Tapirus indicus) and the siamang (Hylobates syndactylus). Reptiles found here include the water monitor (Varanus salvator), false gharial (Tomistoma schlegelii) and the saltwater crocodile (Crocodylus porosus).

== Threats and preservation ==
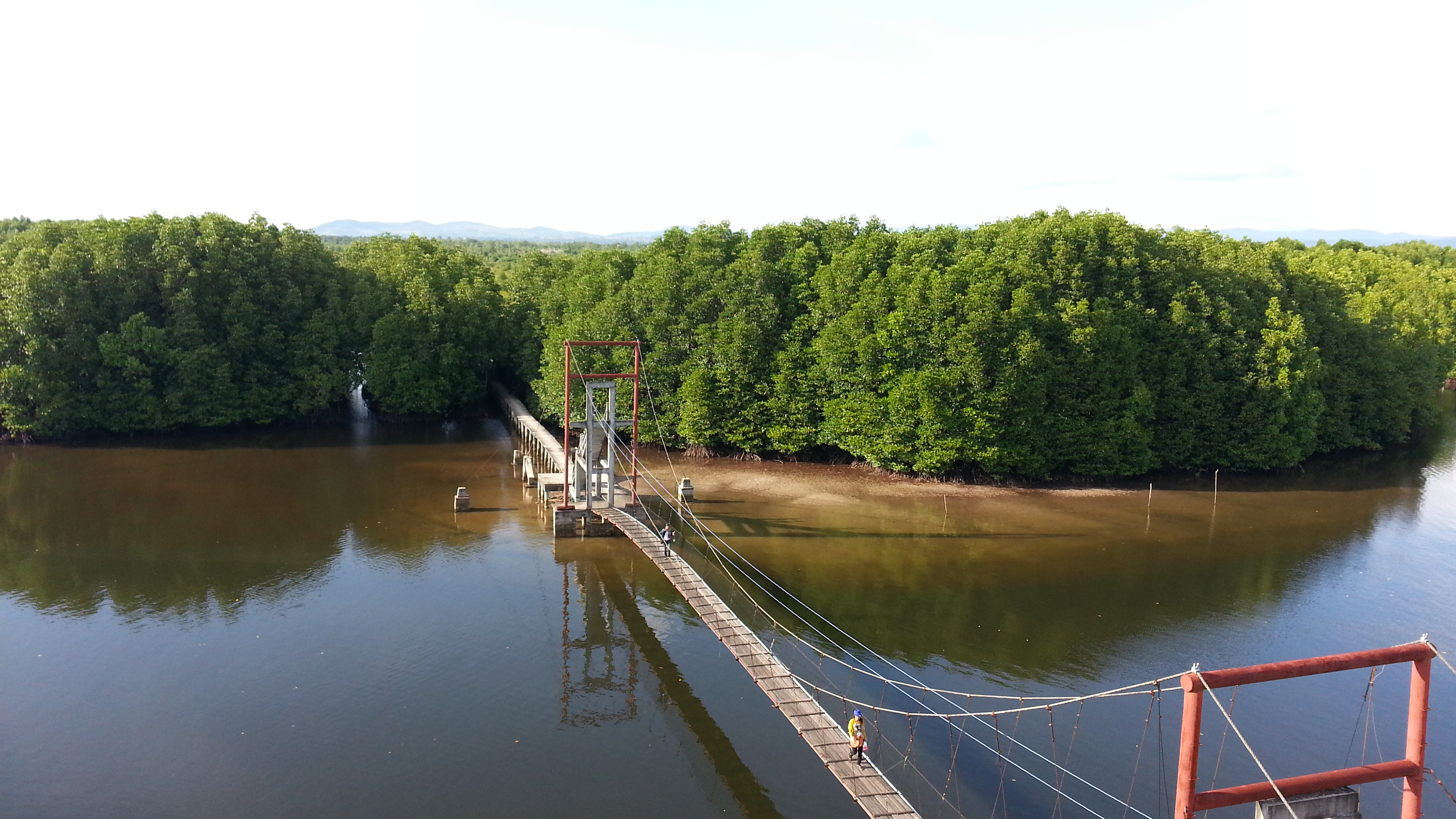
Peam Krasop Wildlife Sanctuary in Cambodia

Mangroves everywhere are vulnerable to clearance for logging and for agricultural development, and in this region have been particularly affected by the Vietnam War damage, particularly America's chemical weapon of defoliants, the Rainbow Herbicides, most notably Agent Orange which destroyed and devastated entire mangrove forests. In Vietnam there has been a post-war program of replanting to try and revive mangrove habitats.

As of 2019 in Myanmar, the cutting down of mangroves to turn into charcoal for sale in China and Thailand continues unabated.
