= Quercus dankiaensis =

Conservation status
- Critically Endangered (IUCN 3.1)

Scientific classification
- Kingdom: Plantae
- Clade: Embryophytes
- Clade: Tracheophytes
- Clade: Spermatophytes
- Clade: Angiosperms
- Clade: Eudicots
- Clade: Rosids
- Order: Fagales
- Family: Fagaceae
- Genus: Quercus
- Subgenus: Quercus subg. Cerris
- Section: Quercus sect. Cyclobalanopsis
- Species: Q. dankiaensis

Binomial name
- Quercus dankiaensis A.Camus

Species of oak tree

Quercus dankiaensis is the accepted name of tree species the beech family Fagaceae; there are no known subspecies. It is placed in Quercus sect. Cyclobalanopsis.

The species appears to be endemic to Vietnam (especially Lam Dong Province), where it may be called sồi Dankia. It grows in montane rain forest on the Đà Lạt Plateau. It is a main canopy tree, growing up to 30 m tall. It has relatively large acorns in 22 x 8 mm cupules.
