= Southern Annamites montane rain forests =

Ecoregion in the Annamites range

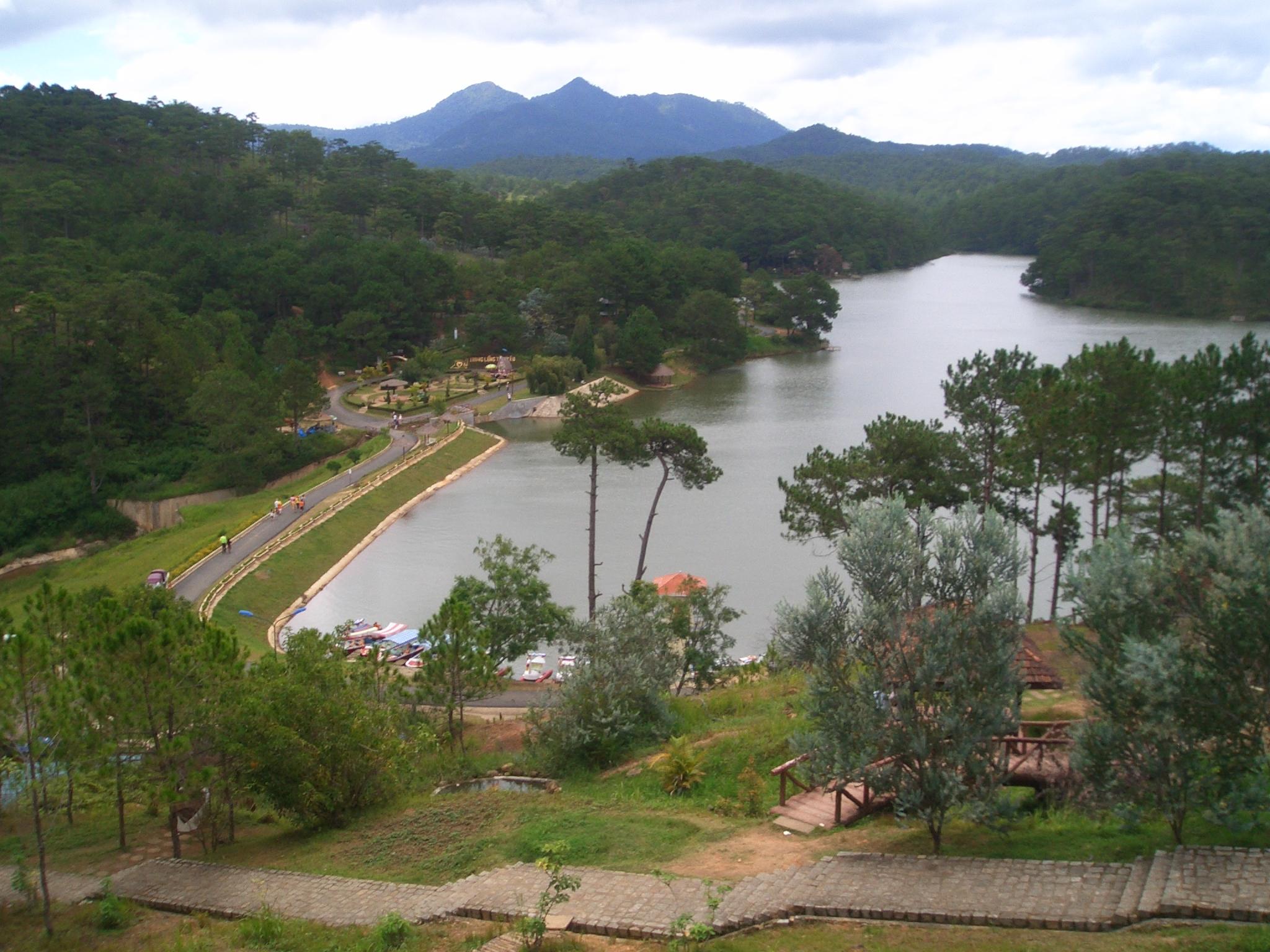
- "Valley of Love", near Da Lat, Vietnam

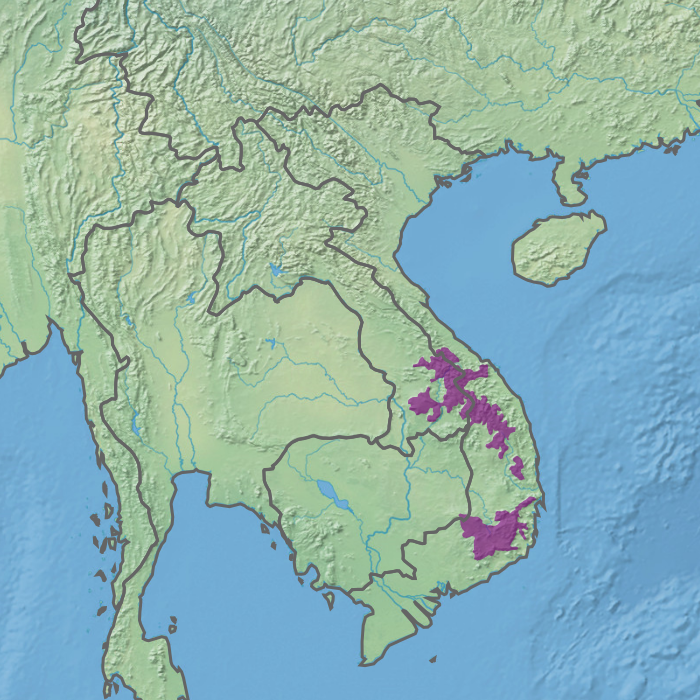
- Ecoregion territory (in purple)

Ecology
- Realm: Indomalayan
- Biome: Tropical and subtropical moist broadleaf forests
- Borders: List: Central Indochina dry forests; Northern Annamites rain forests; Northern Vietnam lowland rain forests; Southeast Indochina dry evergreen forests; Southern Vietnam lowland dry forests

Geography
- Area: 46,620 km^{2} (18,000 sq mi)
- Country: Vietnam, Laos, Cambodia
- Coordinates: 12°N 108.5°E

Conservation
- Protected: 19.65%

The Southern Annamites montane rain forests ecoregion (WWF ID: IM0152) covers a region of high biodiversity in the central and southern mountains of the Annamite Range in Vietnam. Terrain ranges from wet lowland forest to evergreen hardwood and conifer montane rain forest. There is a short dry season centered on January–February, but fog and dew are common throughout the year and support a lush forest character.

== Location and description ==
The ecoregion consists of two main sections. The northern section begins south of the Lao Bao Pass, and extends south along the central Annamites to the Ba River valley. This northern sector around the Kontum Massif is a complex of granite mountains, and includes Ngọc Linh, the highest peak in Vietnam at 2,598 metres (8,524 ft). It also includes the Bolaven Plateau in southern Laos, which just west of the main chain of the Annamites.

The southern section is in the south of Vietnam around the Đà Lạt Plateau, which has a highest point of 2,200 metres (7,200 ft). The southern mountains are of weathered basalt, which creates fertile soil for agriculture.

== Climate ==
The climate of the ecoregion is Tropical savanna climate - dry winter (Köppen climate classification (Aw)). This climate is characterized by relatively even temperatures throughout the year, and a pronounced dry season. The driest month has less than 60 mm of precipitation, and is drier than the average month. In this ecoregion, annual precipitation is 1,800-2,000 mm in the Annamites and in the western regions of the Da Lat Plateau, but can reach over 3,000 mm/year on the eastern edge of the Da Lat Plateau.

== Flora ==
The region is about 75% forested. Most of this is a closed forest of broadleaf evergreens and some needle-leaf evergreens. Wet evergreen forest covers from 600 to 900 meters elevation is characterized by species of Fagaceae, Myrtaceae, and Lauraceae. Above 900 meters, the wet hardwood forest supports a wide variety of tree species, generally dependent on the geology and soil of the location. The canopy of about 30 meters is lower at higher elevations and with thinner soils. Epiphytes are a common feature of these forests. Khasi pine (Pinus kesiya var. langbianensis) is common throughout the region at elevations up to 1,800 meters, particularly in drier areas.

Pinus krempfii and Pinus dalatensis are endemic to the ecoregion, with P. krempfii found only on the Da Lat Plateau, and P. dalatensis on the Da Lat Plateau and several smaller massifs to the north. Both are emergent trees growing 25 meters or more in height above humid montane broadleaf evergreen forest. Pinus krempfii grows in closed-canopy evergreen forests of Castanopsis chinensis, Trigonobalanus verticillata, Engelhardia roxburghiana, and Dendropanax hainanensis. Pinus dalatensis typically grows above a continuous canopy of Schima wallichii, Exbucklandia populnea, and Pentaphylax euryoides and the conifers Dacrycarpus imbricatus and Dacrydium elatum.

== Fauna ==
There are about 134 native species of mammals, including the douc langur, tiger (Panthera tigris), Asian elephant (Elephas maximus), gaur (Bos gaurus), banteng (Bos javanicus), mainland serow (Capricornis sumatraensis), and particoloured flying squirrel (Hylopetes alboniger). Endemic and near-endemic mammals include the red-shanked douc (Pygathrix nemaeus), gray-shanked douc (Pygathrix cinerea), black-shanked douc (Pygathrix nigripes), yellow-cheeked gibbon (Nomascus gabriellae), Truong Son muntjac (Muntiacus truongsonensis), Osgood's rat (Rattus osgoodi), and Mo's spiny rat (Maxomys moi).

410 species of birds are native to the ecoregion. Endemic and near-endemic species include Edwards's pheasant (Lophura edwardsi), Germain's peacock-pheasant (Polyplectron germaini), Vietnamese crested argus (Rheinardia ocellata), collared laughingthrush (Trochalopteron yersini), golden-winged laughingthrush (Trochalopteron ngoclinhensis), short-tailed scimitar babbler (Napothera danjoui), grey-faced tit-babbler (Mixornis kelleyi), black-crowned barwing (Actinodura sodangorum), grey-crowned crocias (Laniellus langbianis), and Vietnamese greenfinch (Chloris monguilloti).

== Protected areas ==
19.65% of the ecoregion is in officially protected areas, including:

- Núi Chúa National Park reaches down to the South China Sea in southeast Vietnam, with Nui Chua peak reaching 1,032 meters. It is a relatively intact ecosystem.
- Bạch Mã National Park includes a former colonial hill station above central coastal city of Huế.
- Kon Ka Kinh National Park covers a biodiverse region in the central highlands of Vietnam, and protects upstream areas of the Ba River.
- Chư Yang Sin National Park is located in Đắk Lắk Province in the central highlands of Vietnam.
