= Langbiangia =

Scientific classification
- Kingdom: Plantae
- Clade: Tracheophytes
- Clade: Angiosperms
- Clade: Eudicots
- Clade: Asterids
- Order: Lamiales
- Family: Gesneriaceae
- Subfamily: Didymocarpoideae
- Tribe: Trichosporeae
- Subtribe: Didymocarpinae
- Genus: Langbiangia; Luu, C.L.Hsieh & K.F.Chung (2023)

Species
- 3; see text

Genus of flowering plants

Langbiangia is a genus of flowering plants in the family Gesneriaceae. It includes three species endemic to the Langbiang Plateau in southern Vietnam.

All three species are calciphilous, growing on humid fertile soils derived from limestone karst, in evergreen broadleaved montane rain forest from 1,450 to 2,000 meters elevation.

Three species are accepted.

- Langbiangia annamensis (Pellegr.) Luu, C.L.Hsieh & K.F.Chung
- Langbiangia poilanei (Pellegr.) Luu, C.L.Hsieh & K.F.Chung
- Langbiangia scutellifolia (Luu, N.L.Vu & T.Q.T.Nguyen) Luu, C.L.Hsieh & K.F.Chung

The three species were formerly classed in genus Primulina, a mostly calciphilous genus native to Vietnam and southern China. The Langbiang Plateau species were the southernmost and disjunct species of Primulina. A phylogenetic analysis published in 2023 found that the three species were distinct from Primulina, and they were placed in the new genus Langbiangia, named for the plateau on which they live.
