= Quercus baolamensis =

Conservation status
- Critically Endangered (IUCN 3.1)

Scientific classification
- Kingdom: Plantae
- Clade: Embryophytes
- Clade: Tracheophytes
- Clade: Spermatophytes
- Clade: Angiosperms
- Clade: Eudicots
- Clade: Rosids
- Order: Fagales
- Family: Fagaceae
- Genus: Quercus
- Species: Q. baolamensis

Binomial name
- Quercus baolamensis H.T.Binh & Ngoc

Species of flowering plant

Quercus baolamensis is a species of oak. It is a tree native to Vietnam. It is known from a single location in southern Annamite Range in Lâm Đồng province, where it grows at evergreen montane rain forest edges at 1000 metres elevation.
