= Endangered Primate Rescue Center =

Primate rescue center in Vietnam

- Trung tâm Cứu hộ Linh trưởng Nguy cấp
- Established: 1993
- Founder: Tilo Nadler
- Type: Non-profit Organization
- Location: Cúc Phương National Park, Ninh Bình, Vietnam
- Coordinates: 20°14′48″N 105°42′47″W
- Website: EPRC Asia

Endangered Primate Rescue Center (Vietnamese: Trung tâm cứu hộ linh trưởng nguy cấp) (also known as EPRC Vietnam) is located in Cúc Phương National Park, Ninh Bình Province, in Vietnam's Red River Delta.

The center is one of the first animal rescue centers in Vietnam and one of the largest primate rescue centers in Southeast Asia. It is a non-profit project aiming at rescuing, rehabilitation, breeding, research and conservation of endangered primate species in Vietnam.

== History ==
In 1991, Tilo Nadler came to Vietnam to make a documentary film about Delacour's Langur. On this trip, he saw the threats that endangered primate species were facing. In 1992, Frankfurt Zoological Society called for help from specialists to perform a langur conservation project in Vietnam and Tilo Nadler volunteered for this project.

Starting from March 1993, Tilo Nadler built EPRC Vietnam and became the Director of the rescue center in Cúc Phương National Park. Currently EPRC Vietnam is managed under Vietnam Primate Conservation Program and it is operated by Zoo Leipzig and Cúc Phương National Park. Tilo Nadler has retired from the center, and it is now run by contracted Directors from Zoo Leipzig.

== Facilities ==
At the present, EPRC Vietnam has more than 48 large enclosures, 2 electric-fenced semi-wild areas (one sized 2 hectares and one 5 hectares). The semi-wild areas are built to prepare qualified animals to be released into the wild. They also help researchers to study the behavior of primates changing from captivity to a semi-wild area. There are enclosures with heated housing specifically designed for primate species of Central and South Vietnam.

== Animals ==
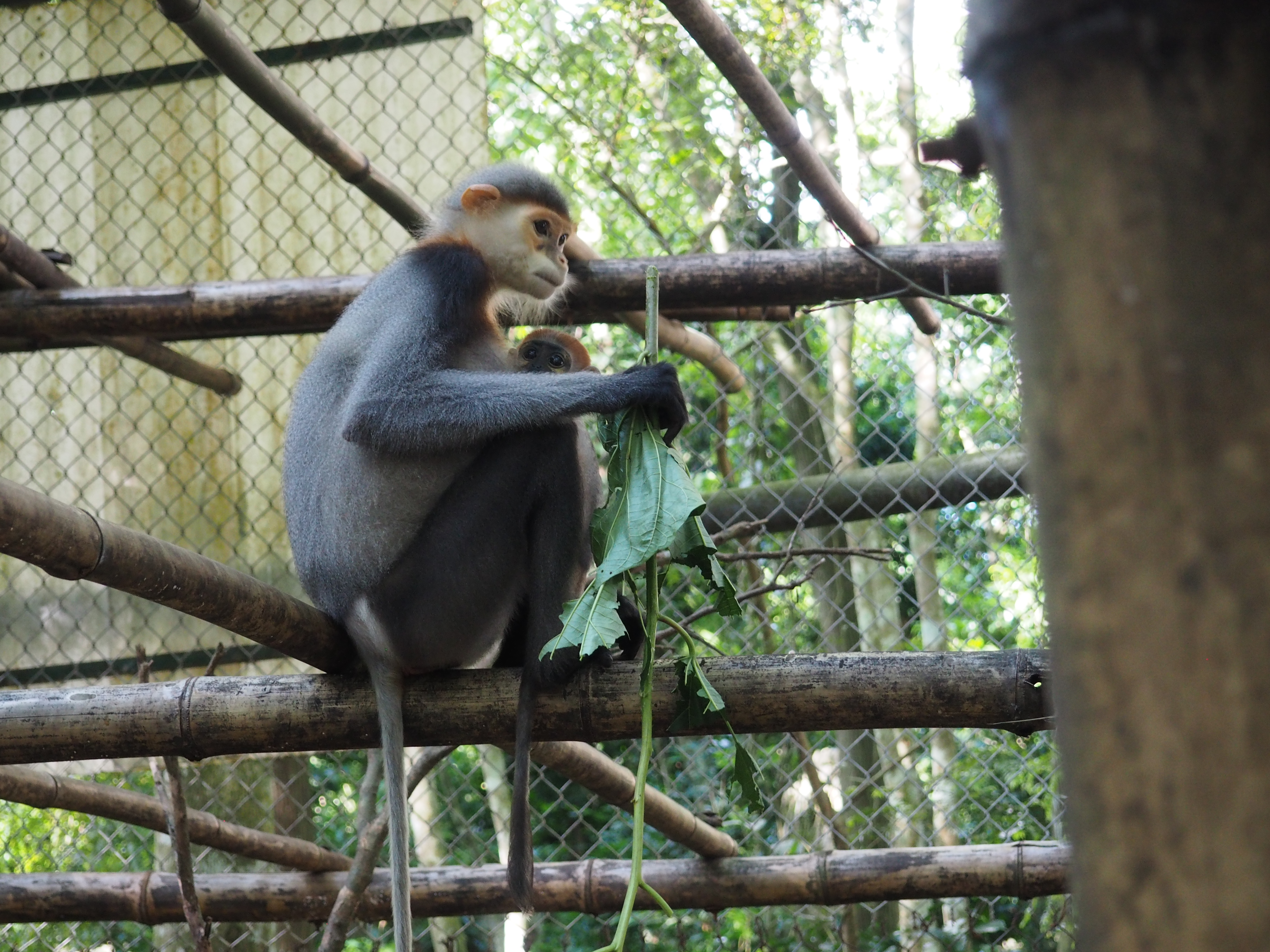
The Endangered red-shanked douc langur at EPRC Vietnam.

There are around 180 animals at EPRC Vietnam and this number fluctuates over time due to release, or death of animals. Some animals born at EPRC Vietnam are the first of their species to be bred successfully in captivity such as the Catba langur, Delacour's langur and Gray-shanked douc langur.

There are 15 primate species there:

- Lorises: Slow loris, Pygmy loris;

- Langurs: François' langur, Hatinh langur, Catba langur, Delacour's langur, Indochinese gray langur, Laotian langur;

- Douc langurs: Red-shanked douc langur, Gray-shanked douc langur;

- Gibbons: Black gibbon, Northern white-cheeked black gibbon, Southern white-cheeked black gibbon, Northern yellow-cheeked black gibbon, Southern yellow-cheeked gibbon.

== Funding ==
Approximately 75% of support for EPRC Vietnam comes from Zoo Leipzig. The rest comes from donors, donations, volunteers and merchandise.

== Staff ==
There are currently 31 staff at EPRC; most of them are animal keepers coming from Muong ethnicity.
