= Núi Chúa National Park =

National park in Vietnam

- IUCN category II (national park)
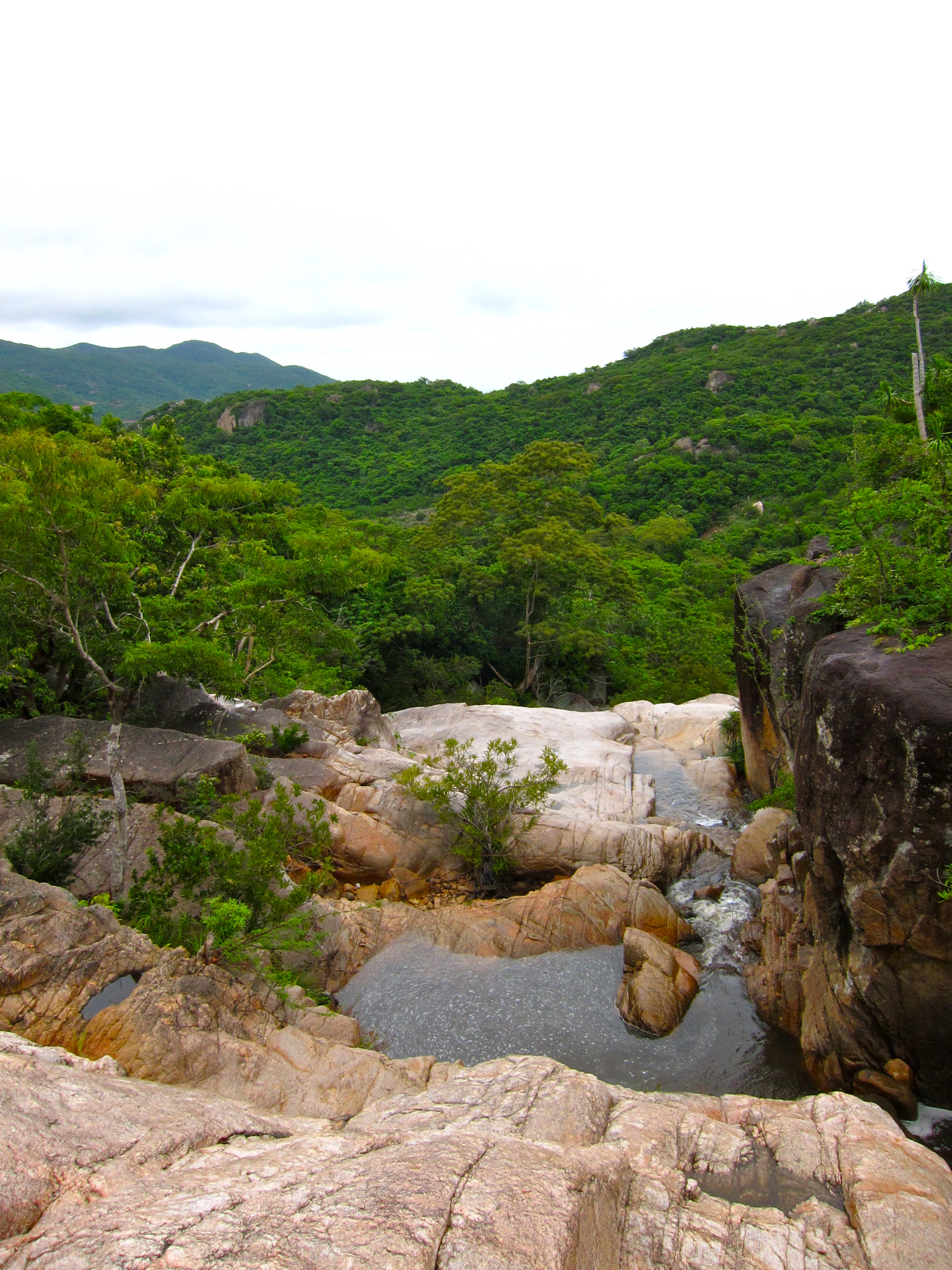
- Lo O Stream, Núi Chúa National Park

- Location within Vietnam
- Location: South Central Coast and Central Highlands, Vietnam
- Nearest city: Đồng Nai
- Coordinates: 11°42′01″N 109°09′10″E
- Area: 29,865 km^{2} (11,531 sq mi)
- Established: 2003
- Governing body: People's Committee of Khánh Hòa Province

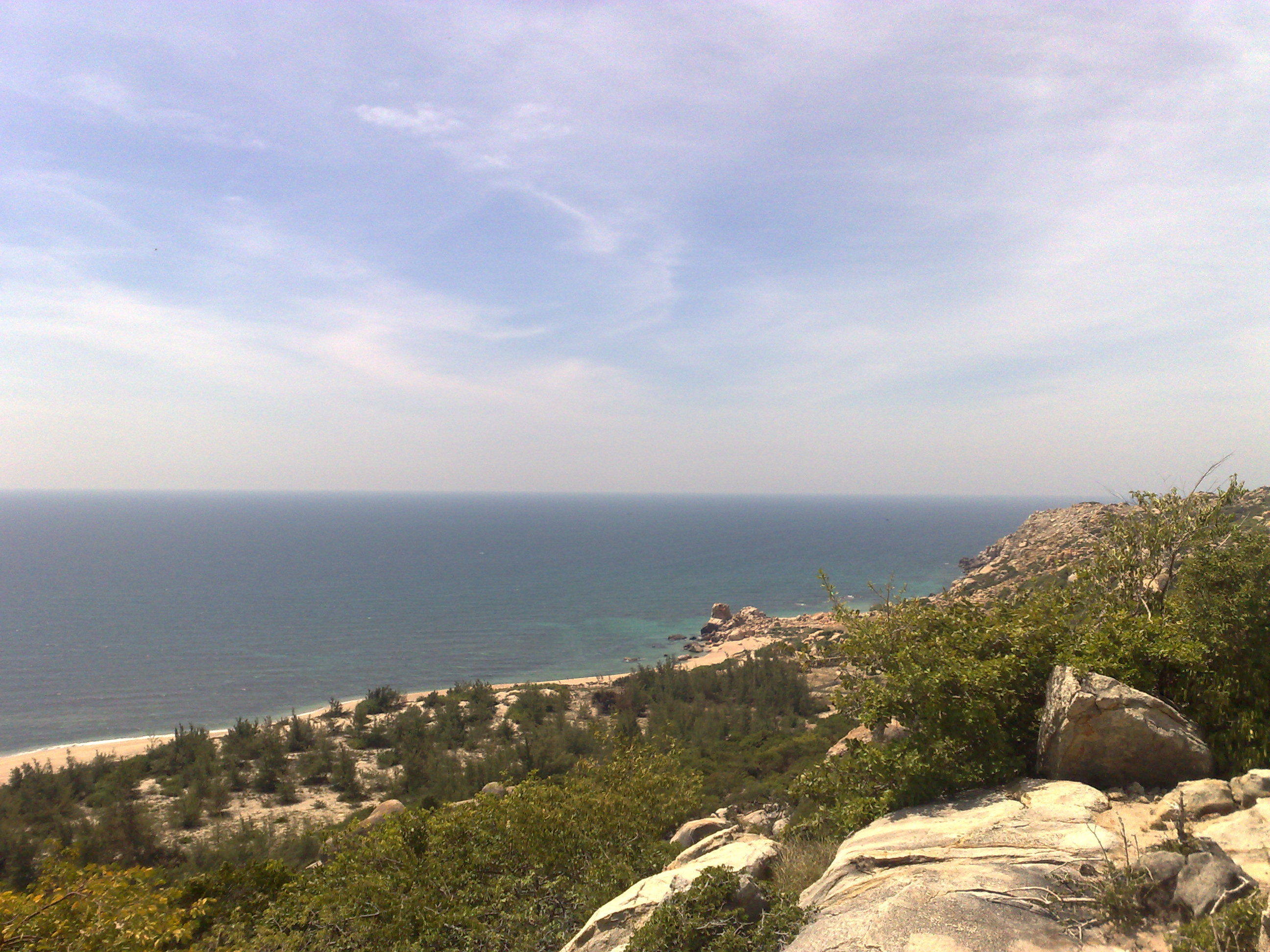
Sea Turtle Nesting Beach, Núi Chúa National Park

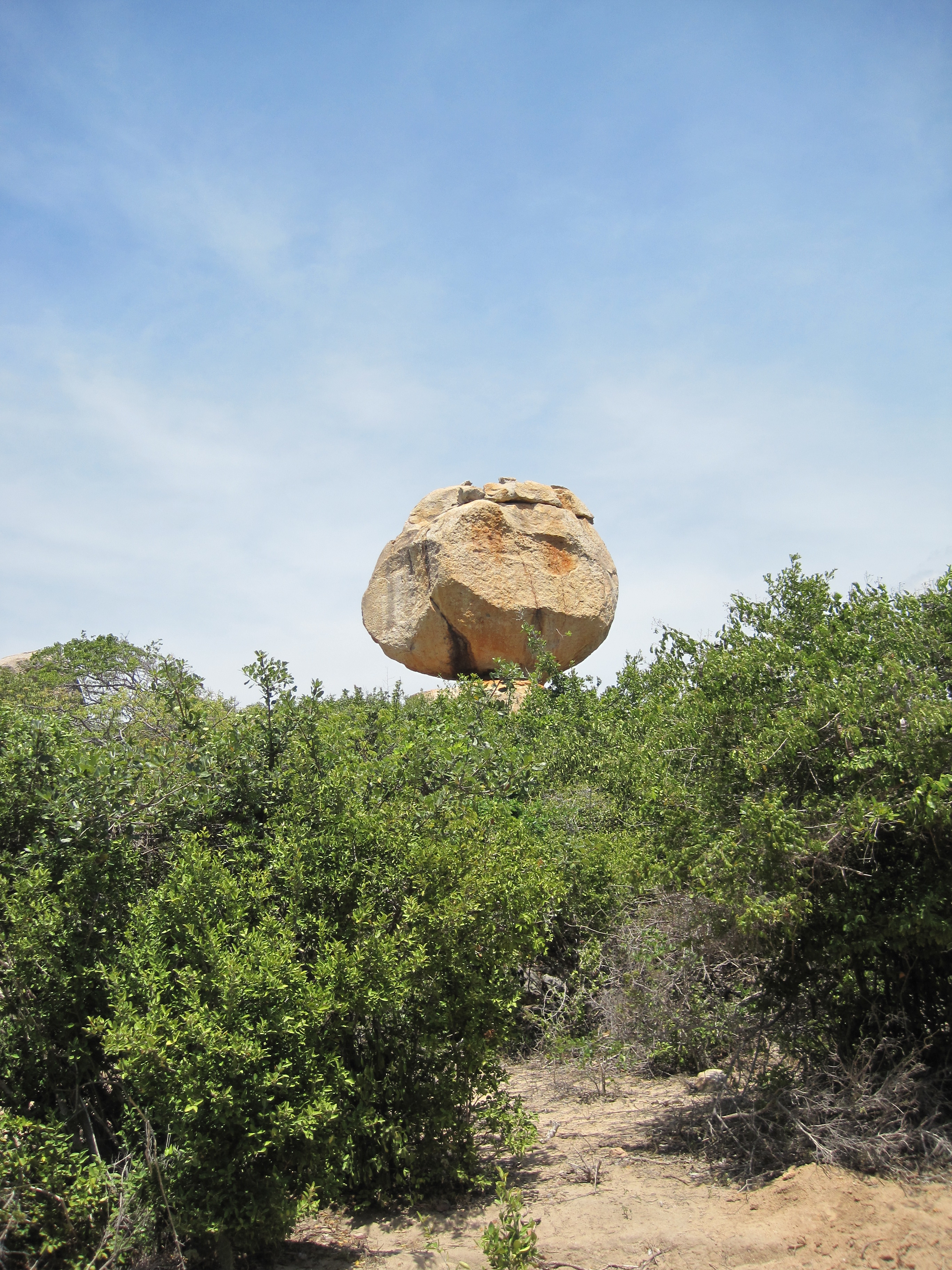
Rock formation at Nui Chua National Park

Núi Chúa National Park (Vietnamese: Vườn quốc gia Núi Chúa), formerly Núi Chúa Nature Reserve is a national park in the province of Khánh Hòa Province, South Central Coast and Central Highlands, Vietnam.

== Geography ==
The National Park was established according to "Decision 134/QĐ-TTg" dated 9 July 2003 signed by the Prime Minister of Vietnam. This decision turned Núi Chúa Nature Reserve into Núi Chúa National Park.

Núi Chúa National Park is situated on a wide, mountainous promontory, which projects into the South China Sea between Cam Ranh and Phan Rang bays. Elevations range from sea level to 1,039 m at the summit of Núi Chúa peak.

Núi Chúa National Park is bounded to the south and east by the South China Sea, to the west by Highway No.1 and to the north by the boundary with neighbouring Khánh Hòa Province. Amanoi, a five star franchise hotel owned by Aman Resorts is also found on the Eastern border of the Park. The total area of the Park is 24,353 ha, comprising:

- Administration and services area of 5 ha
- Buffer zone of 11,200 ha.
- Forest rehabilitation area of 8, 261 ha
- Strict forest protection area of 16,087 ha

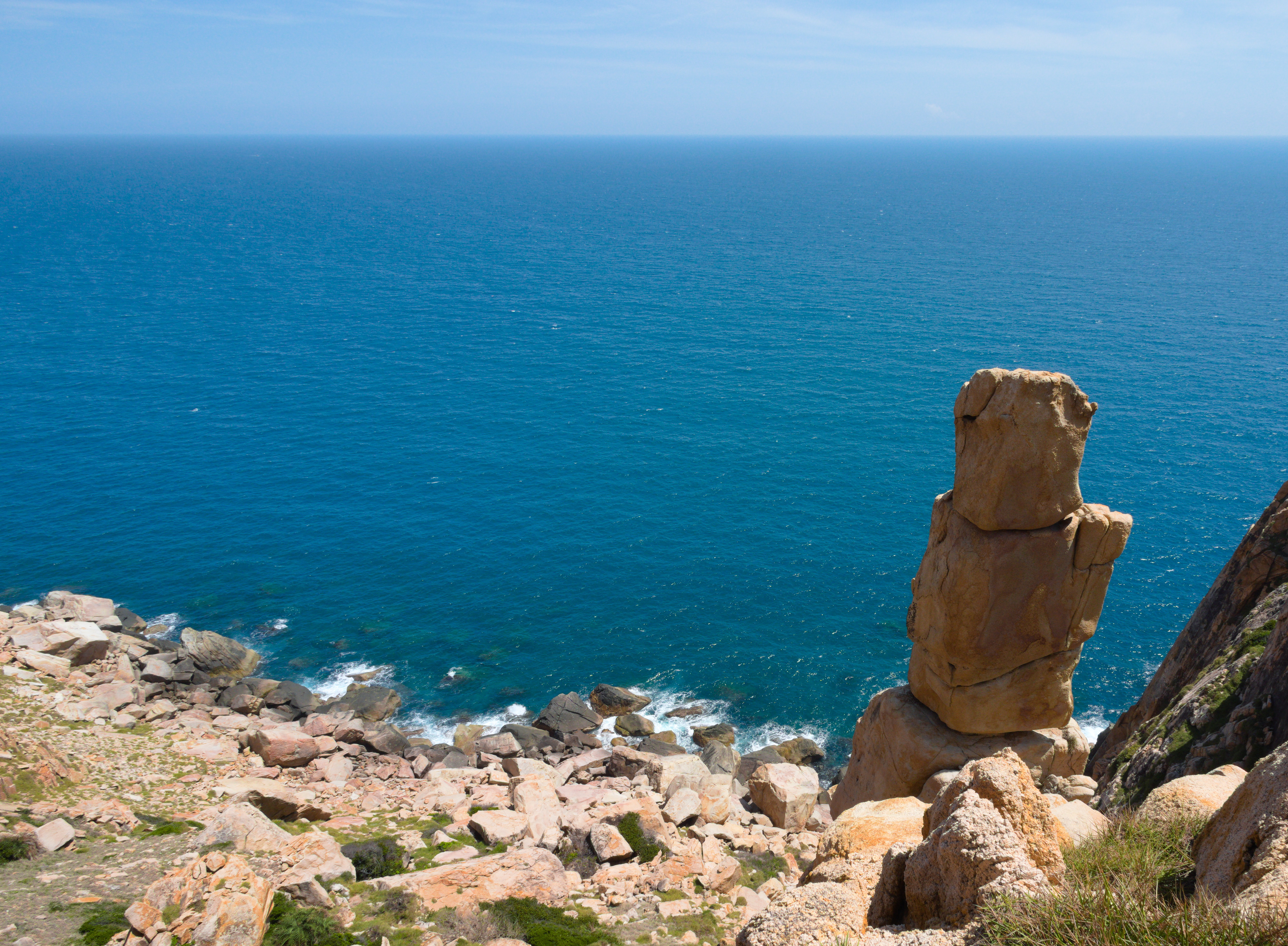
Coastal view from Nui Chua National Park

Núi Chúa National Park also abuts a protected marine area of 7,352 ha.

The northern end is the southern part of Cam Ranh Bay, which administratively belongs to Nam Cam Ranh commune, Khánh Hòa Province. The southeastern end is in the South China Sea, in the communes of Vĩnh Hải. The west is limited by the National Route 1.

Khánh Hòa Province is the driest and hottest province in Vietnam, and the area receives the lowest rainfall in south-central Vietnam with an average of 650 mm per year. The dry season extends for eight months from November or December to July or August.

== Biodiversity values ==
Núi Chúa National Park is one of the priority areas for nature conservation in Vietnam. It is one of the few remaining sites in Southeast Asia where the coastal and marine habitats are still in relatively good condition, and it protects a largely intact biodiversity. It contains unique semi-arid vegetation and sea turtle nesting beaches, and is located on a promontory bordering a marine park with coral reefs.

Núi Chúa National Park is in the south-eastern part of the Great Annamites Ecoregion, one of the four Global Ecoregions identified by the World Wildlife Fund in the southern region of Vietnam. It is made up of the terrestrial ecoregions of Southern Vietnam Lowland Dry Forests and Southern Annamite Montane Rain Forests. There are few, if any, opportunities to expand the areas of the three Special Use Forests in this dry coastal forest ecoregion, so strict protection of the existing resources is imperative. The semi-arid coastal areas of southern Vietnam are the most arid in Vietnam, so the vegetation also has high value as a source of germ plasm for restoring other areas that become drier or are affected by sea level rises due to climate change.

The original vegetation was a mixture of evergreen forest, semi-evergreen forest and deciduous forest. However, most of the forest was destroyed at the beginning of the 1990s as a result of over-exploitation. Currently the only relatively undisturbed primary forest remaining is lower montane evergreen forest, distributed in the north of the Park at elevations above 800 metres. At lower elevations there are extensive areas of degraded and secondary forest. The southern parts of the Park, at elevations between 150 and 800 metres, support scrub dominated by thorny trees. This habitat type is only found at sites with hot and dry climates and is under-represented within Vietnam's protected areas network.

72 mammal species and 181 bird species have been recorded in Núi Chúa National Park. The park also supports a number of mammal and bird species of global conservation concern, including the black-shanked douc Pygathrix nigripes, pygmy loris Nycticebus pygmaeus, Asian black bear Ursus thibetanus, sun bear (U. malayanus), large-antlered muntjac Muntiacus vuquangensis and siamese fireback Lophura diardi. It is reported to have the highest known population of black-shanked douc in Vietnam.

There are twelve species of bats in the park, including the lesser short-nosed fruit bat listed in the IUCN Red List of Vietnam. Other bats are: the greater short-nosed fruit bat, Ratanaworabhan's fruit bat, Leschenault's rousette, great roundleaf bat, intermediate roundleaf bat, bicolored roundleaf bat, intermediate horseshoe bat, Pearson's horseshoe bat, least horseshoe bat, Rhinolophus sp. and the round-eared tube-nosed bat. As well as being important for the conservation of terrestrial biodiversity, the National Park is important for marine biodiversity. It has eleven species of turtles, both terrestrial and marine – the highest for a Special Use Forest in Vietnam. Also, several of the beaches within the park constitute the last remaining nesting sites in mainland Vietnam for small numbers of endangered green turtles and other marine turtles on the IUCN Red List. The fringing coral reefs are also particularly rich with 307 species recorded, and are generally in good to excellent condition. The most recent surveys by WWF identified 46 species with new distribution records for Vietnam, and a distinctly different coral community structure to other reefs in Vietnam.

== Conservation issues ==
Núi Chúa National Park is now an "island" of natural forest surrounded by agricultural land to the north and west, and sea to the south and east. The main threats to biodiversity conservation are subsistence hunting and forest produce harvesting and agricultural encroachment into forest area, as well as historic land clearing.

About 30,000 people live inside the boundaries of Núi Chúa National Park, and a further 25,000 live in the buffer zone. The majority of these people belong to the Kinh, Cham and Raglay ethnic minority groups. The Raglay people make up 21% of the community and Cham people another 3%. The socioeconomic level of many of these people is quite low, especially the inhabitants of the National Park, who experience an average of six months of food shortages per year. These communities are heavily dependent on forest resources, which are being depleted, and work is underway to secure sustainable alternative livelihoods for these communities.

Forest clearance for agriculture is a particular problem – there are over 600 ha of wet rice land, over 2,500 ha of shifting cultivation and over 750 ha of industrial cropland inside the National Park boundary. Agricultural products such as rice, banana, cashew nuts, papaya, jackfruit and pineapple can secure the livelihood of the Raglay for a maximum of four months. For the remaining months of the year they are dependent on illegally harvested forest products collected from more than 100 plant species. Traded forest products are estimated to contribute 56% to their annual income per head. Common products are timber, charcoal, fuelwood and non-timber forest products (NTFPs).

Another problem is the harsh climate, which makes the forest highly susceptible to fire, as well as climate change and associated erratic weather events. There has been also been increased competition for water that has its source within the Park's watershed. Water scarcity is arising out of climate change with more frequent and intense droughts being recorded in the last five years. Recent studies by Oxfam Great Britain and Kyoto University have highlighted that climate change is already having a profound impact on the intensity of droughts making local livelihoods even more marginal. As the droughts become more frequent and intense, there has been greater reliance and pressure on certain resources from within the Park, particularly wood for charcoal production, as other forms of livelihoods reliant on good water sources become less viable.

== Gallery ==
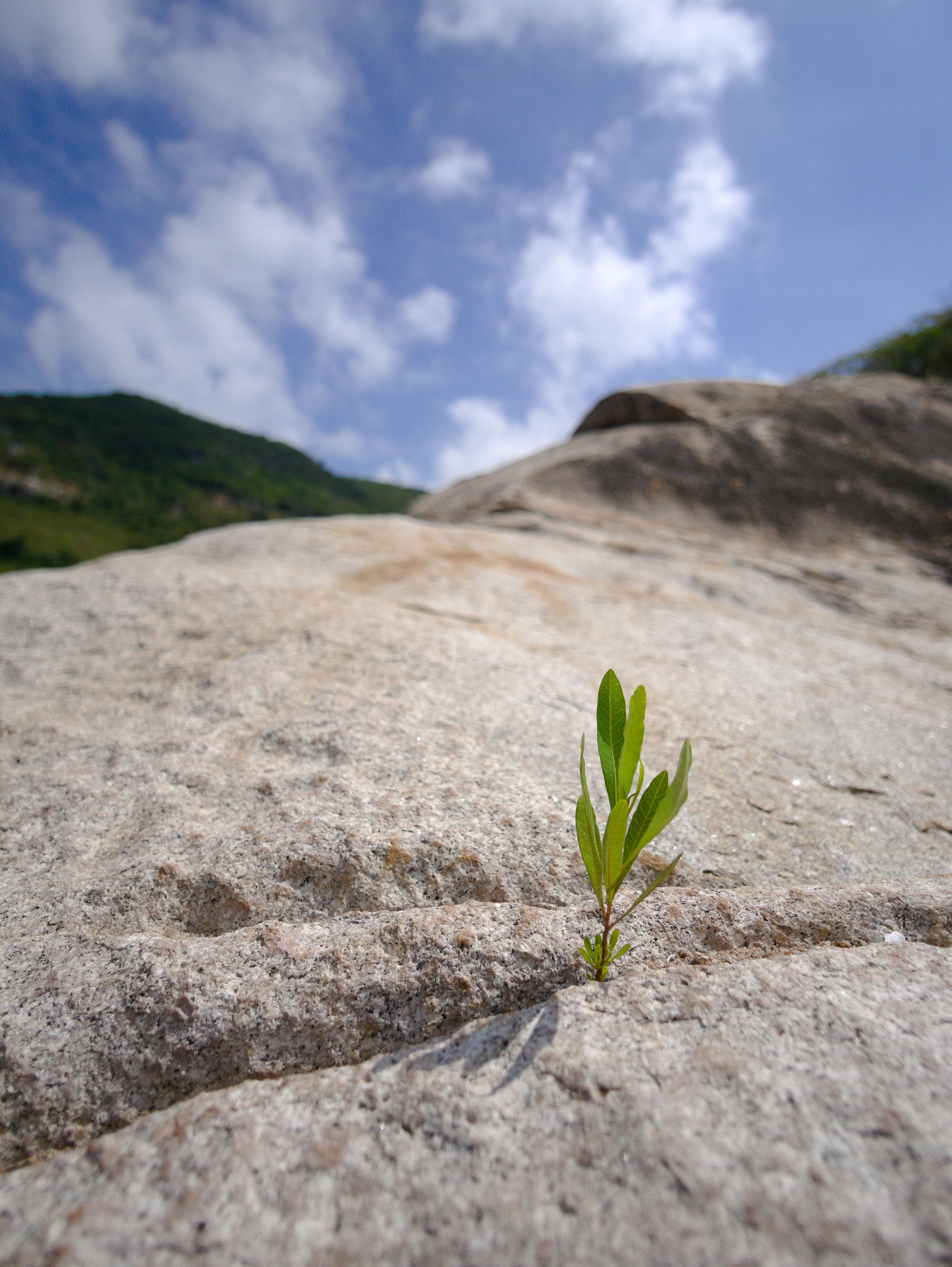
A Dodonaea viscosa sapling in Vinh Hy
