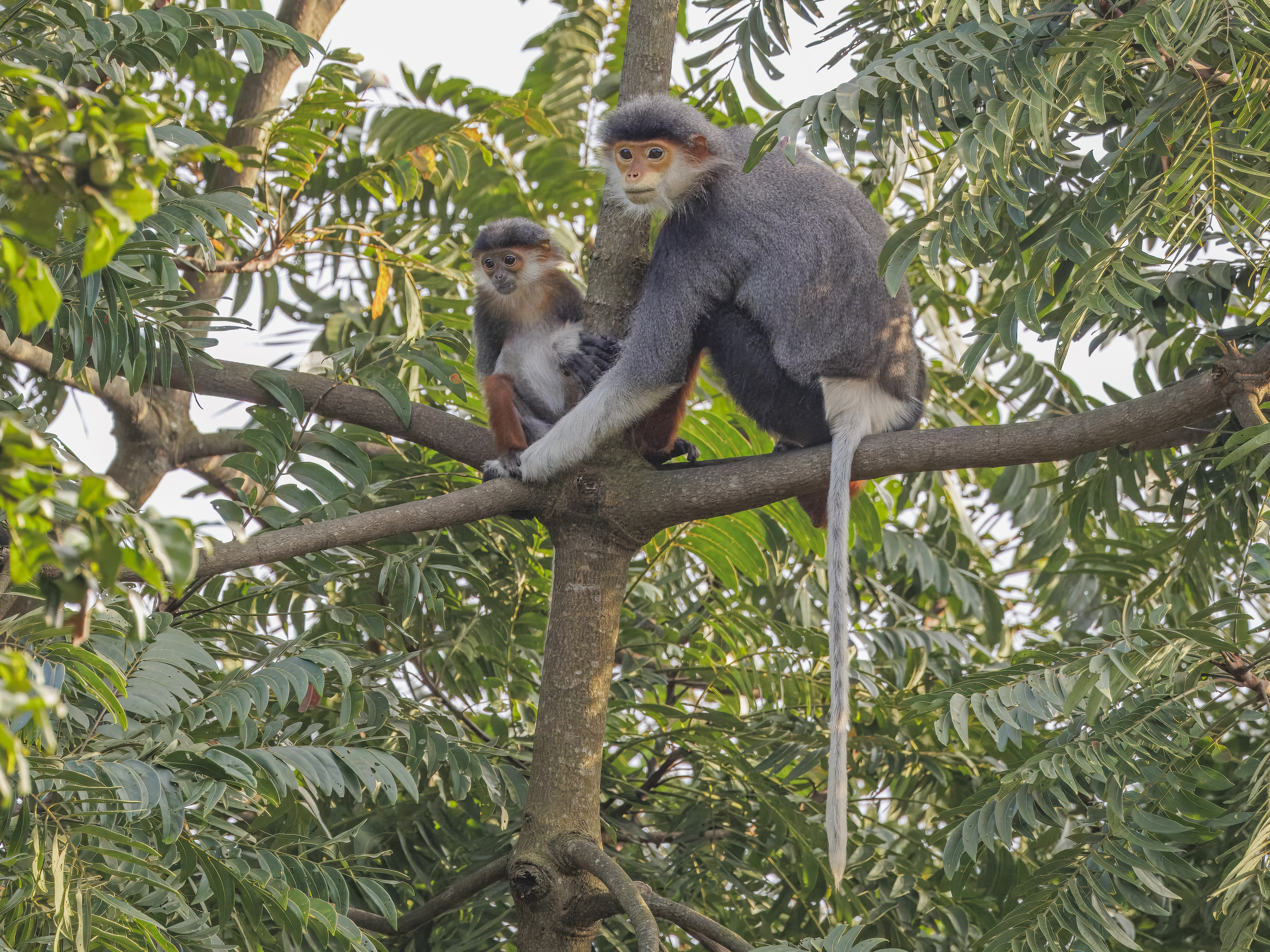

Conservation status
- Critically Endangered (IUCN 3.1)
- CITES Appendix I

Scientific classification
- Kingdom: Animalia
- Phylum: Chordata
- Class: Mammalia
- Order: Primates
- Family: Cercopithecidae
- Genus: Pygathrix
- Species: P. nemaeus

Binomial name
- Pygathrix nemaeus (Linnaeus, 1771)
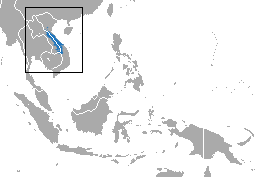
- Red-shanked douc range

= Red-shanked douc =

Species of Old World monkey

The red-shanked douc (Pygathrix nemaeus) is an arboreal and diurnal Old World monkey belonging to the Colobinae subfamily. They are endemic to Laos, Vietnam, and Cambodia. They are known for their bright colors and exhibit sexual dimorphism through their body size. The species has been declared critically endangered by the International Union for Conservation of Nature, with the main threats being: hunting, habitat loss and pet trade. They are one of three species in the genus Pygathrix, the other two being the black-shanked (P. nigripes) and gray-shanked (P. cinerea) doucs.

Red-shanked doucs live in fission-fusion, multilevel societies that have a mean of 18 individuals per band. They are folivorous and consume mainly Acacia pruinescens, Ficus racemosa, Millettia nigrescens, Zanthoxylum avicennae and Castanopsis ceratacantha. Their four-chambered stomachs that allow for bacterial fermentation help them with their high-fiber diet.

== Geographic range and habitat ==
The red-shanked douc is native to Indochina; Vietnam, southern Laos, and possibly northeastern Cambodia, east of the Mekong river. Before 1967, the douc was completely unstudied. It is the only douc species that inhabits all three countries of Indochina. In Laos, red-shanked doucs occur from the southern Nam Ghong Provincial Protected Area to the central-north part of the country. Laos is believed to have the largest population of red-shanked doucs, with Nakai-Nam Theun National Protected Area in central Laos having the most individuals of approximately 4,420 groups, followed by the Hin Namno National Protected Area. In Vietnam, the species lives between Nghệ An and Gia Lai provinces, from 18°29'N to 14°21'N. The Sơn Trà Nature Reserve on Sơn Trà Mountain in central Vietnam holds the greatest Vietnamese population with approximately 700–1300 individuals. The Phong Nha – Kẻ Bàng National Park is also an important Vietnamese site for the species.

There was one observation of the red-shanked doucs in Cambodia by Rawson and Ross in 2008 in the Ratanakiri Province at the border of Vietnam. There was a report of a red-shanked douc specimen that was given to the Staatliches Museum by the Dresden Zoological Garden who had said that it originated in Hainan, China but the zoo records no longer exist so it remains uncertain.

Red-shanked doucs are found in evergreen, semi-evergreen and occasionally limestone forests, up to 1,600 metres (5,200 ft) in elevation. They are arboreal and spend most of their time in the forest canopy, including to sleep. They occasionally get on the ground to drink water or eat dirt that contains minerals. According to an ecological niche model, red-shanked doucs can live between approximately 14°N to 21°N. Their home range is approximately 36 hectares (89 acres) and they have a core area of 8 hectares (20 acres), with a smaller range in the dry season of 24 hectares (59 acres) and a larger range in the wet season of 33 hectares (82 acres). There are weak correlations between precipitation, temperature, and diet and home range but not enough to draw conclusions from them.

== Characteristics ==
Like other Doucs, the red-shanked douc is a long, slender monkey. The male has a head and body length of 55–82 centimetres (22–32 in) with a tail that measures 56–74 centimetres (22–29 in), and the female is between 60–63 centimetres (24–25 in) long with a tail that measures 44–60 centimetres (17–24 in) long. Males weigh 8.6–11.4 kilograms (19–25 lb), and females 6.6–10.5 kilograms (15–23 lb). The red-shanked douc are among the most colorful primates. They are considered "Queen of primates" thanks to their distinctive and unique appearance. They have agouti hair on their crown, temples, inner thighs, ventral coat, nape of the neck, back, triceps and lateral sides of their arms. Their crown is silver, their temples are red hair and their foreheads are black. They have white whiskers that are approximately 12 cm long for adult males. Their eyes have a high axis. The fur on their cheeks and on their throat is white. Their collar is orange with black from one shoulder to the other. Their face is a yellow-brown color and they have light blue eyelids. Their inner arms and inner, lateral and back thighs are black while their lower legs are a vibrant red. Their abdomen and back are silver yet their sacral area is white. Both feet and hands are black as well as their nipples. Their tails are white and are oftentimes equal in length to their head and body length.

The coloration gradually becomes less vibrant and having smaller red patches with more southern latitudes. In Nam Ghong Provincial Protected Area in Laos, red-shanked doucs only have small red patches around their ankles.

Although minor, the red-shanked doucs are sexually dimorphic with respect to body size but not coloration. There is a slight difference in rump markings between males and females; the male has round white spots above the triangle of white on his rump, while the female does not. Males of all ages have a white spot on both sides of the corners of the rump patch, and red and white genitals.

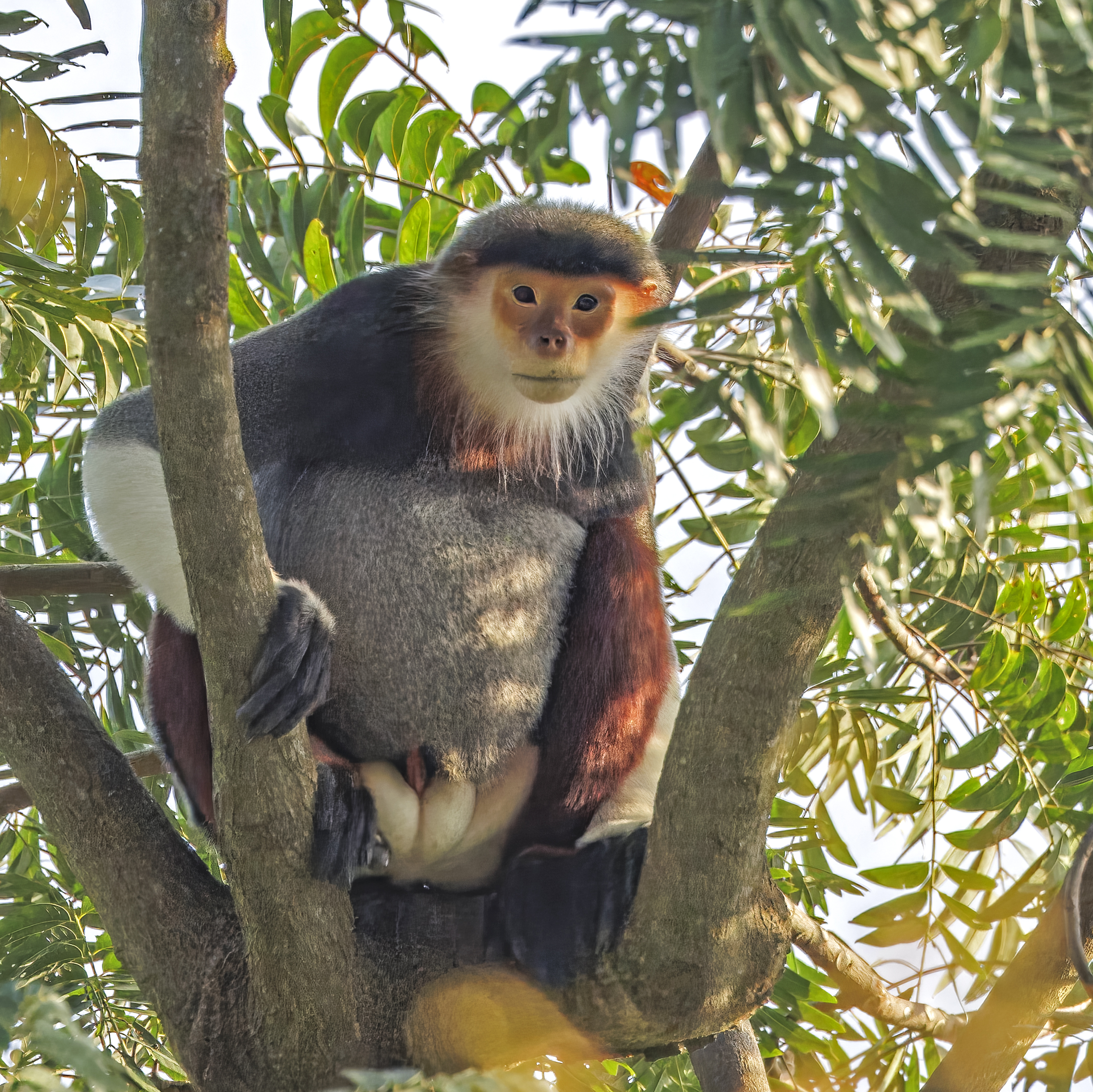
Male

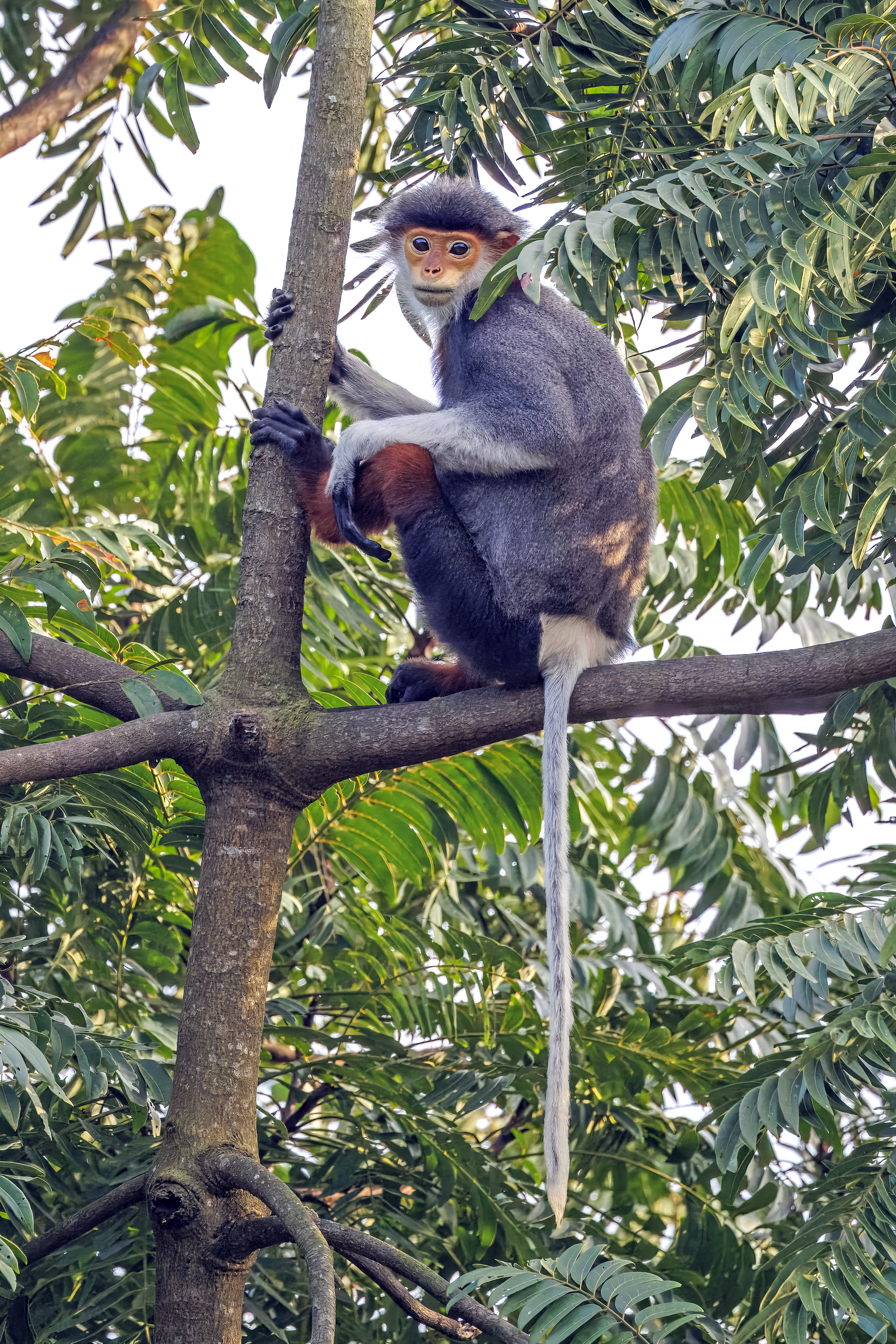
Female

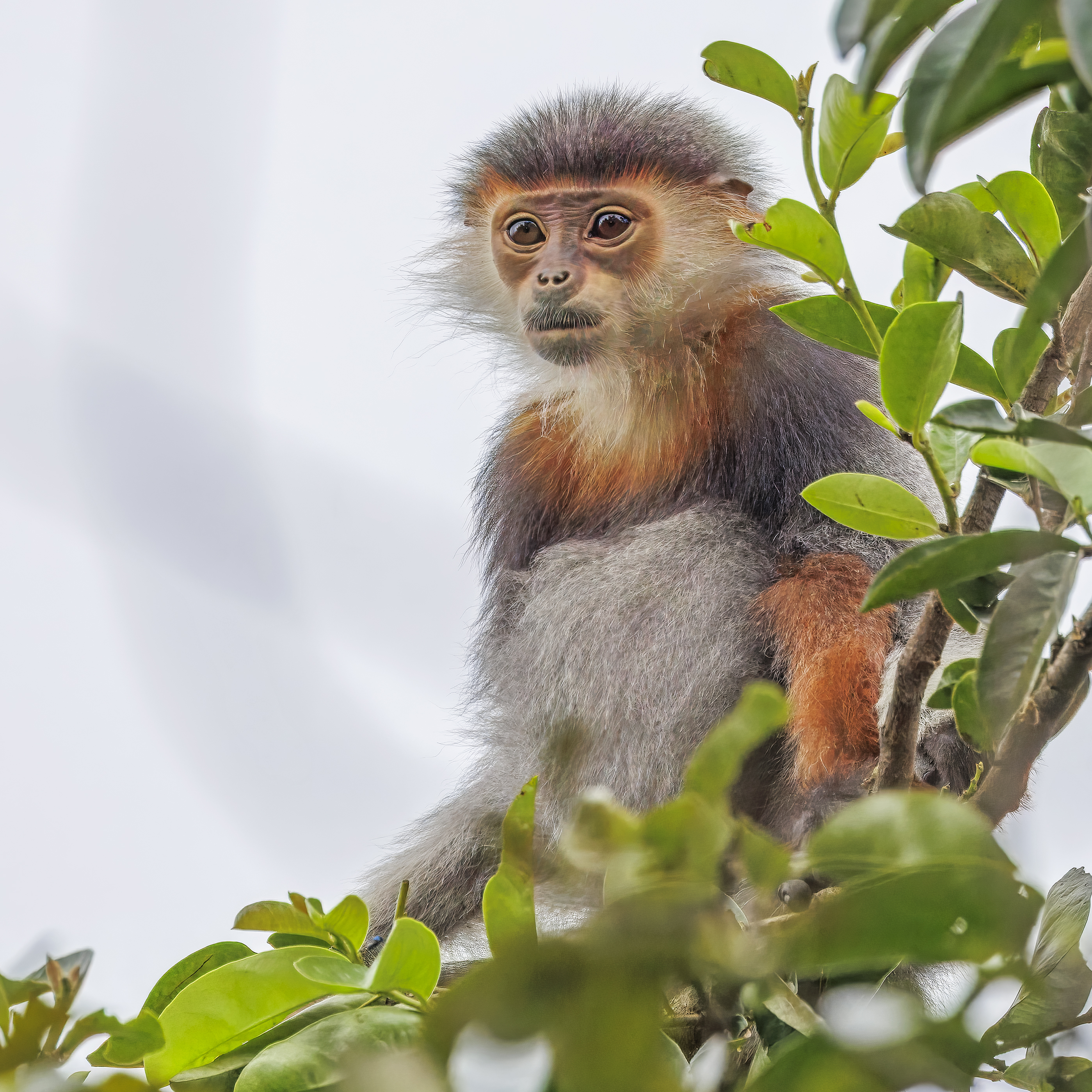
Juvenile

== Behavior ==
This monkey communicates using facial expressions. It has a specific "play face" with the mouth open, teeth partially bared and chin thrust forward. Sometimes, it closes its eyes and paws blindly towards another douc without regard for the hazards of doing so when up a tree. A fixed stare is a threat display. A grimace with the mouth open and the teeth exposed is a submissive gesture given in response to a stare and is also used to initiate grooming or play. The red-shanked douc has a low-pitched growl that is given as a threat, and a short, harsh distress squeal. During adult play, they perform an eyelid display where they blink their eyes open and closed to show their light blue eyelids.

They are a fairly peaceful species and agonistic behavior has been very rarely reported. In the San Diego Zoo, researchers observed that in the instances where there was agonistic behavior, it only lasted a few seconds and did not result in injury. Grooming lasts up to an hour and is most commonly found between adult females. In captivity, young red-shanked doucs groom and care for infants, showing signs of alloparental care.

The activity budget of wild red-shanked doucs is rest at 35.3%, movement at 28.6%, socializing at 21.7%, feeding at 13.7% and self-grooming at 0.7%.

=== Group composition ===
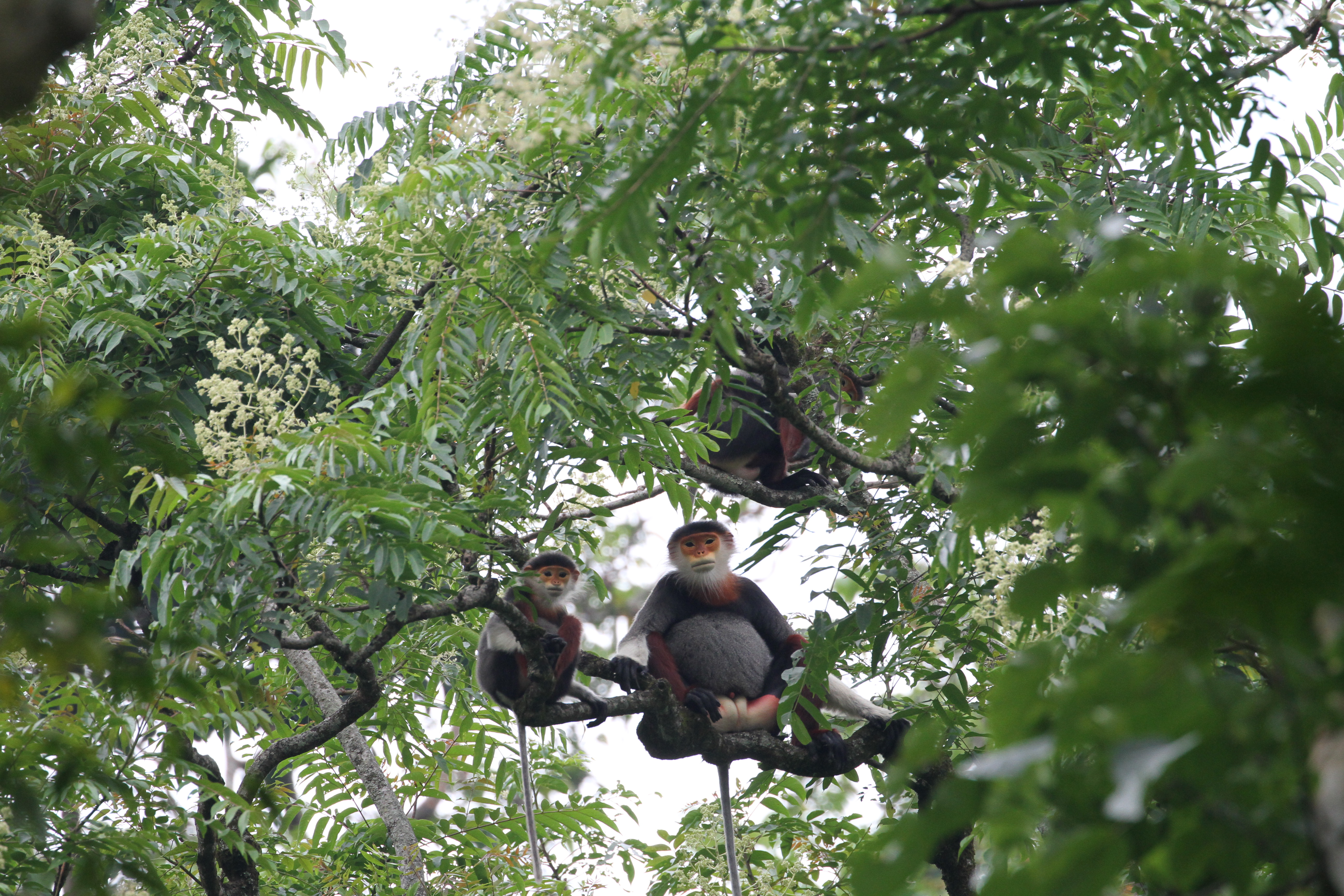
Group of red-shanked doucs

Red-shanked doucs live in multilevel, fission-fusion societies in one-male/multi-female or multi-male/multi-female groups with a male-to-female ratio of 1.0:1.63 and an adult-to-young ratio of 1.1:1.0. The bands contain a mean of 18 individuals in a mean of 2.7 units per band and a mean of 6.5 individuals per unit. Groups of up to 50 have been recorded. Group size changes according to the season. Both males and females have their own hierarchies and males are dominant to females. Both males and females will eventually leave the group they were born into.

Red-shanked doucs fuse overnight and fission during mornings and early afternoons. When they are fused, they rest more and when they fission, they are more active.

There does not seem to be any difference in daily fission-fusion from wet to dry season yet overall fission-fusion events increase during part of the wet season, from October to December. In a study at the Sơn Trà Nature Reserve, 55.32% of their observations were fusion events and 44.68% were fission events. This behavior is believed to help with regulating feeding competition. Red-shanked doucs are very inflexible with membership into their groups.

== Locomotion ==
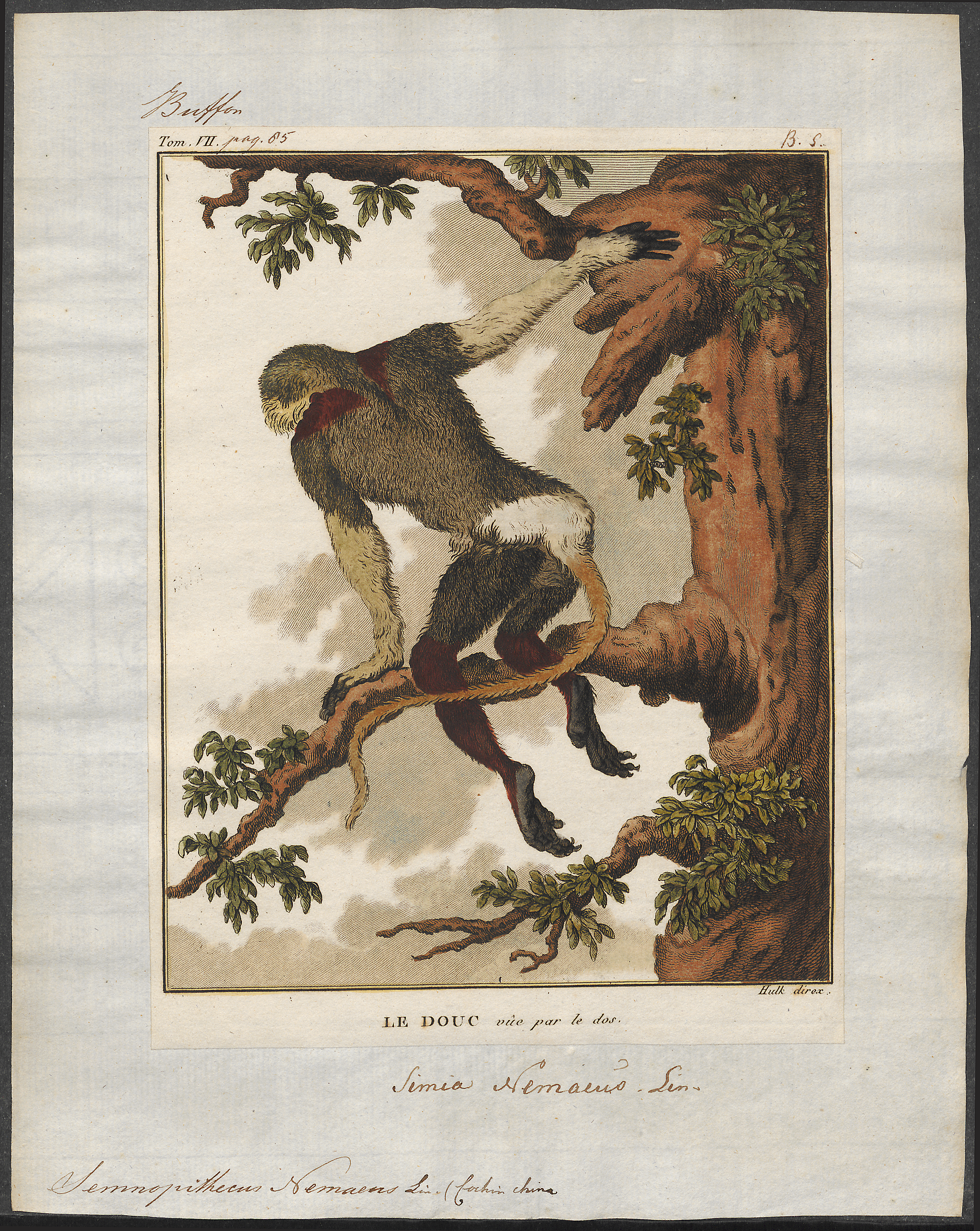
Red-shanked douc moving in a tree

In captivity, red-shanked doucs use brachiation for almost half of their locomotion whereas, in the wild, arm-swinging accounts for an average of 18% of locomotion. Juveniles use arm-swinging the most (34.3%), followed by subadults (21.7%), adult females (17.6%), adult females carrying infants (15.5%), and then adult males (9.8%). This showed that with increased body weight there is a decreased amount of brachiation.

When they travel by foot, their tail will usually hang down. Like all other Old World monkeys, its tail is not prehensile. It uses its tail solely for balance, and it uses its arms and legs to move through the forest along established routes. When on the move, the group is led by adult males, with juvenile males bringing up the rear and the females and infants staying safe in the middle. This douc is an aerial specialist, moving high up in the canopy. It is very agile and frequently leaps up to 6 meters (20 feet), with its arms outstretched over its head, and landing on two feet.

When danger is not present, red-shanked duacs move noisily through its habitat. When the group is disturbed, it will silently flee through the tree canopy. When startled, they may bark loudly and slap branches with their limbs.

== Mating and development ==
=== Mating ===
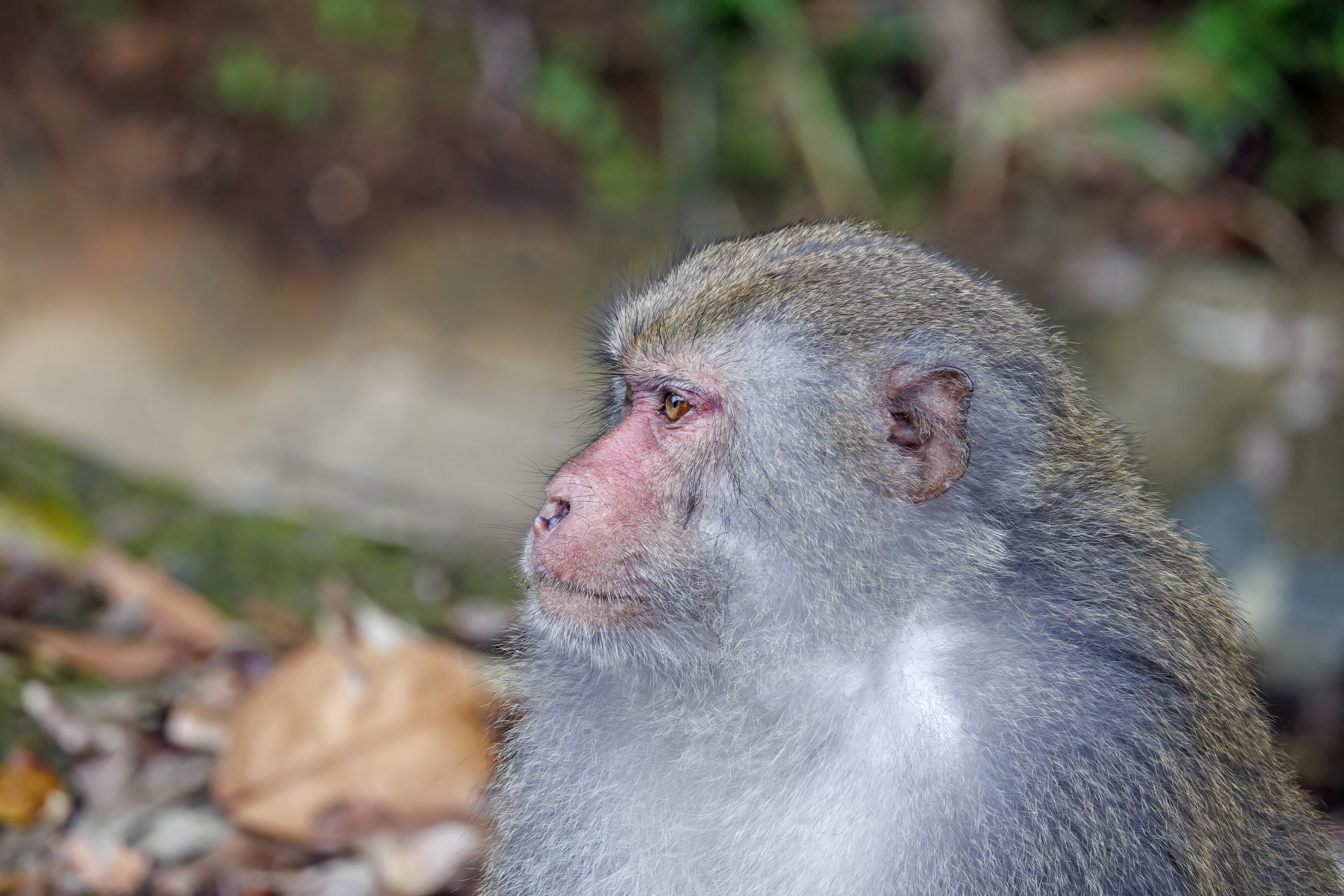
hybrid with Rhesus macaque (Macaca mulatta)

In captivity, female red-shanked doucs reach sexual maturity at four years old and males at four years and eight months. Mating occurs all year but has peaks between August–December. Mating is initiated by both sexes jutting their jaw forward, raising and lowering their eyebrows, shaking their head and squinting their eyes. Copulation occurs after the female crouches and presents her sex organ to the male. Single-mount and multiple-mount matings have been reported. Copulation can still happen while the female is pregnant. Female red-shanked doucs go into estrus every 28–30 days and with it, there is a reddening of their rump.

=== Menstruation and pregnancy ===
Female doucs have an average menstrual cycle of 26.4 days, with their follicular phase lasting an average of 13.1 days and their luteal phase lasting 14.8 days. Estradiol and estrone are the main types of estrogen present in female red-shanked doucs.

Births occur year-round but peak between August and October and again between February and April. The birth interval is between 16 and 38 months. The gestation period lasts between 165 and 210 days, resulting in the birth of a single offspring or very rarely, twins. In captivity, it was observed that the pregnant female will find a high place in the enclosure to give birth. The head of the infant emerges after 90 minutes of labour which is followed by the placenta that weighs 90–120g. The oldest recorded birth was from a 26-year-old female.

=== Development ===
The young are born with their eyes open and they latch on to their mothers instinctively. The baby's body coloration is lighter than an adult's. Its face is more of a blue color and the body is a lighter beige. As it grows older, its body darkens while its face lightens, achieving adult colors at 10 months. In captivity, other group members may look after an infant, and other females may even suckle it. In one study, an orphaned infant was fed by two females in the group and also cared for by a male. The first six months of a red-shanked douc's life is the most challenging. In captivity, they can live for up to 25 years.

== Diet ==
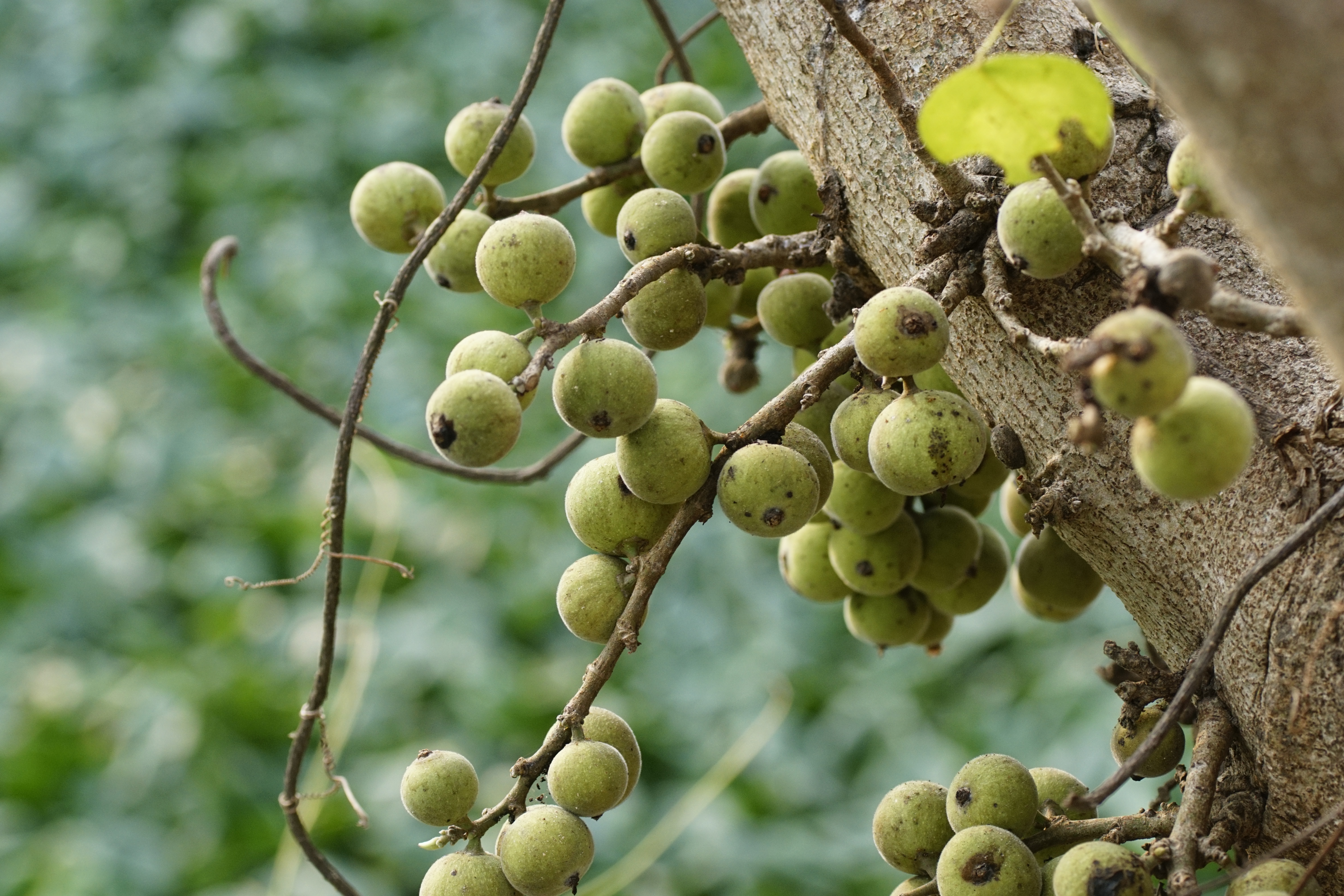
Ficus racemosa

Red-shanked doucs are highly folivorous. In the Sơn Trà Nature Reserve found they consume 54.8% buds and young leaves, 22.6% mature leaves, 3.7% leaf petioles and 18.9% other plant parts. Per month, they found that the red-shanked doucs consumed a mean of 18 species per month and a total of 226 species consumed altogether. Out of the 226 species, there are five species that were eaten 47–82% of the time: Acacia pruinescens, Ficus racemosa, Millettia nigrescens, Zanthoxylum avicennae and Castanopsis ceratacantha. Red-shanked doucs are selective feeders and flexible eaters because of their ability to eat a wide variety of food in all seasons. Fruit is consumed mainly in the morning, which is common amongst leaf-eating monkeys as this is where they derive their energy for the day.

They have different eating patterns during the wet season and the dry season both in what they eat and in the parts of the plants that they eat, although it is not a drastic change. Figs however, are consumed all year long and make up 16–36% of their diet. It is the second most commonly consumed plant by the monkeys and they eat the fruit, leaves and flowers.

They eat peacefully together, not quarreling over food, and have been known to share their food with others. Often, they will share the same clump of foliage and may even break pieces off and hand them to each other, a type of active generosity that is rare among Old World monkeys. Like all other doucs, they do not have cheek pouches.

== Conservation ==
In 2000, the IUCN Red List of Threatened Species classified the red-shanked douc langur as endangered. In 2020, the IUCN updated their classification of the species to critically endangered, due to the population's continual decline. It was also listed in the Vietnam Red Book in 2007. In 2019, the Vietnamese prime minister classified them as a high-risk species that needs protection, in Decree 06. The species is listed in CITES I, which prohibits commercial international trade. More than half of the species has been lost in the past 30–40 years.

The main threat to the red-shanked douc is from hunting. Their meat is used for food, traditional medicine, and for international sale or trade. Local people often hunt the species for consumption, pets, or making glue. Although hunting of the species is technically illegal, it is not strictly enforced and has little effect. In the Dong Ampham National Protected Area in Laos, on the border with Vietnam, local hunters have estimated that approximately fifty red-shanked doucs are killed each year. From 2015 to 2018, the Bach Ma National Park Forestry Protection department in Vietnam confiscated 13 kg of red-shanked douc meat. Their behavioral characteristics are believed to make the species particularly easy to hunt. Vietnam has the highest hunting levels of the species.

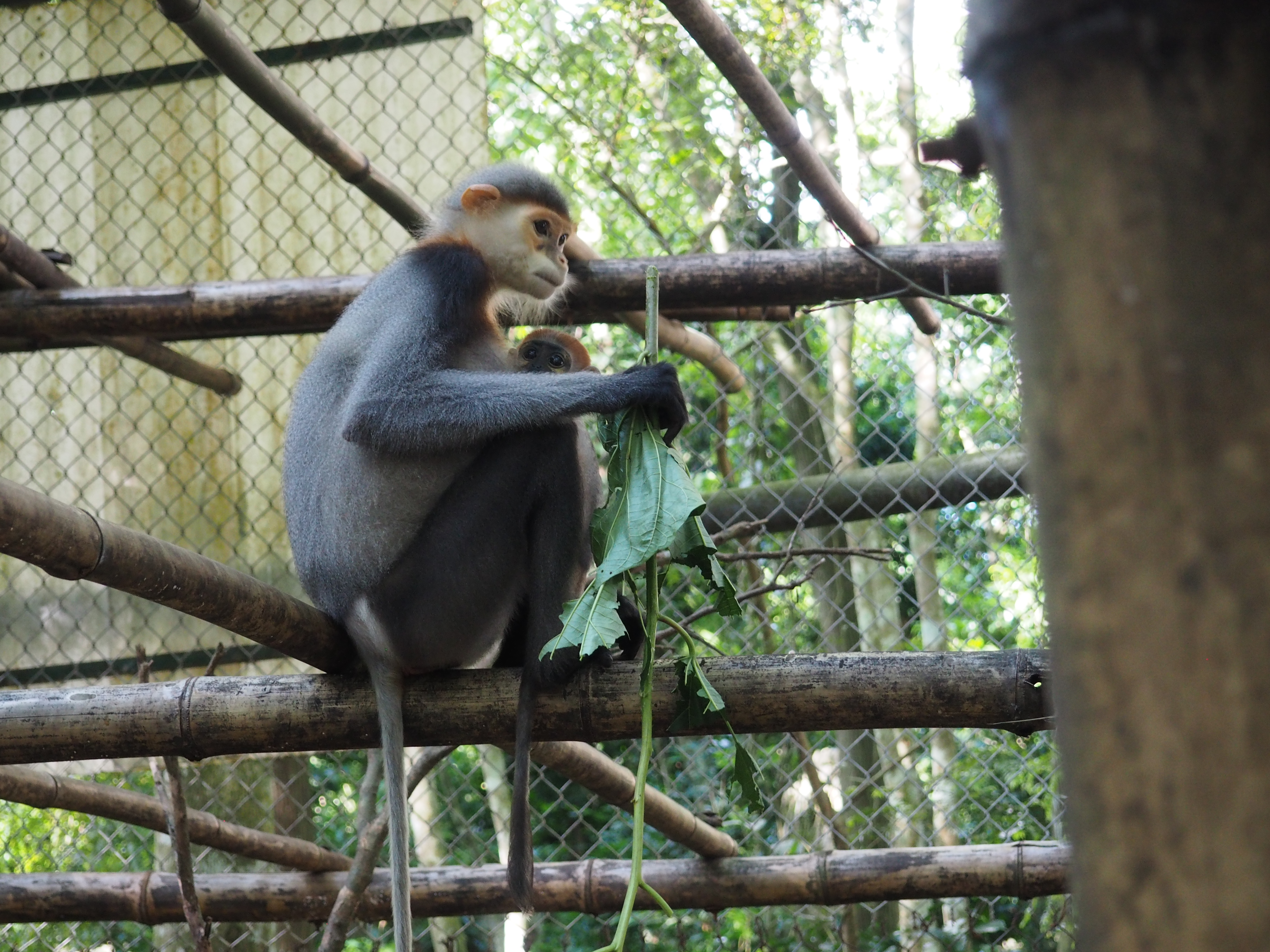
Red-shanked douc in captivity

Their other main threats are pet trade, habitat fragmentation, creation of agricultural land, and military installations.

With Laos having the biggest population of red-shanked doucs, the country has been marked as being the most important for the species' conservation. A study conducted by Camille N. Z. Coudrat et al. stated that the best approach to conserving the monkeys is to focus on the largest populations, specifically in Laos. At present, there is no conservation effort in that country. There have been efforts to breed red-shanked doucs in captivity since the late 1960s, but they are difficult to keep in zoos due to factors such as their diet, so currently, there are only 33 individuals in captivity worldwide.

Habitat loss in Sơn Trà due to development plans poses a high risk to the monkeys. Historically, Sơn Trà had a military installation, so many animals in the region were shot as practice targets. Currently, the red-shanked doucs in Sơn Trà Nature Reserve are protected by the army, police and forest protection departments of Da Nang and Sơn Trà.
