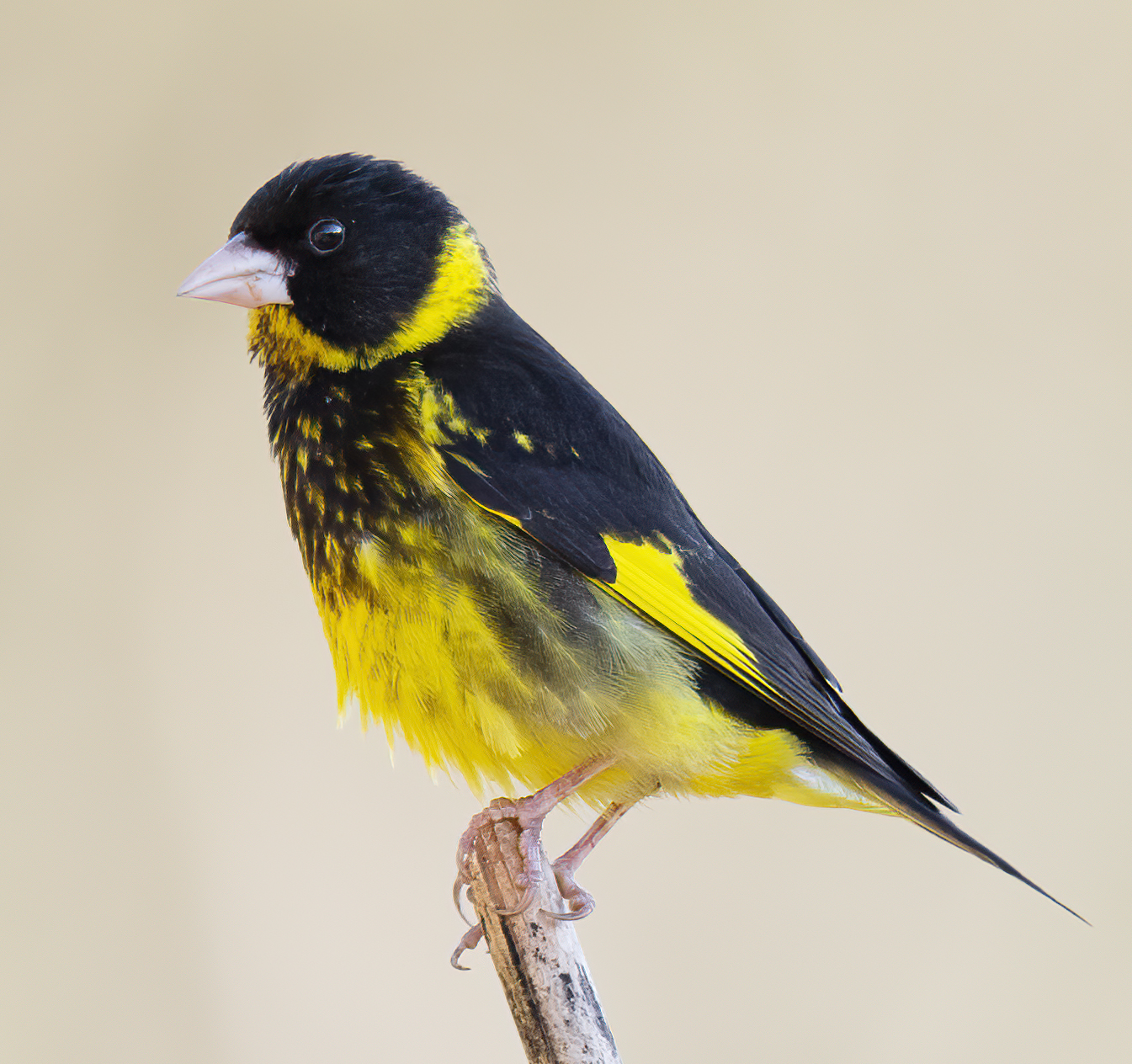

Conservation status
- Least Concern (IUCN 3.1)

Scientific classification
- Kingdom: Animalia
- Phylum: Chordata
- Class: Aves
- Order: Passeriformes
- Family: Fringillidae
- Subfamily: Carduelinae
- Genus: Chloris
- Species: C. monguilloti

Binomial name
- Chloris monguilloti (Delacour, 1926)

Synonyms
- Carduelis monguilloti

= Vietnamese greenfinch =

Species of bird

The Vietnamese greenfinch (Chloris monguilloti) is a small passerine bird in the family Fringillidae. It is found only in Đà Lạt Plateau of southern Vietnam. Its natural habitat is open montane pine forest and scrubland. It is threatened by habitat loss.

== Taxonomy ==
The first formal description of the Vietnamese greenfinch was by the American ornithologist Jean Théodore Delacour in 1926 under the binomial name Hypacanthis monguilloti. In the past the greenfinches were placed in the genus Carduelis but when molecular phylogenetic studies found that they were not closely related to the other species in Carduelis, they were moved to the resurrected genus Chloris. The genus had been first introduced by the French naturalist Georges Cuvier in 1800. The word Chloris is from the Ancient Greek khlōris for the European greenfinch; the specific epithet was chosen to honour Maurice Antoine François Monguillot, the General Secretary of French Indochina. The species is monotypic.

== Description ==
The Vietnamese greenfinch is 13.5 to 14 cm (5.3 to 5.5 in) in length and weighs between 15 and 16 g (0.53 and 0.56 oz). It has a large conical bill, a black head and a narrow bright yellow collar. The plumage of the female is similar to that of the male but is less brightly coloured.

== Range and habitat ==
The Vietnamese greenfinch is native to the Đà Lạt Plateau in southern Vietnam. It is inhabits open montane pine forest of Pinus kesiya, along with forest edges and secondary growth, from 1,050 to 1,900 meters elevation, although it has been recorded as low as 600 meters elevation. It feeds on the seeds of pine trees, and has been observed flycatching recently-hatched termites.
