= Đà Lạt Plateau =

Plateau in southeastern Vietnam

The Đà Lạt Plateau (also called Lâm Viên Plateau, Lang Biang Plateau) is a plateau in southeastern Vietnam. At its centre is the city of Da Lat. Several mountains in this area rise to over 2,000 m (6,562 ft), the highest being Chư Yang Sin Summit (Ede: Čư Yang Sin; Vietnamese: đỉnh núi Chư Yang Sin) at 2,442 m (8,012 ft).

== Geography ==
The plateau is at the southern end of the Annamite Range. It covers parts of Dak Lak, Khanh Hoa, Lam Dong, and Ninh Thuan provinces.

== Climate ==
Đà Lạt Plateau is known for its mild and constant temperatures, which vary very slightly throughout the year. The average temperature in April, the warmest month, is 26.3 °C. January, the coldest month, sees an average temperature of 10.5 °C. October is the wettest month of the year.

== Ecology ==
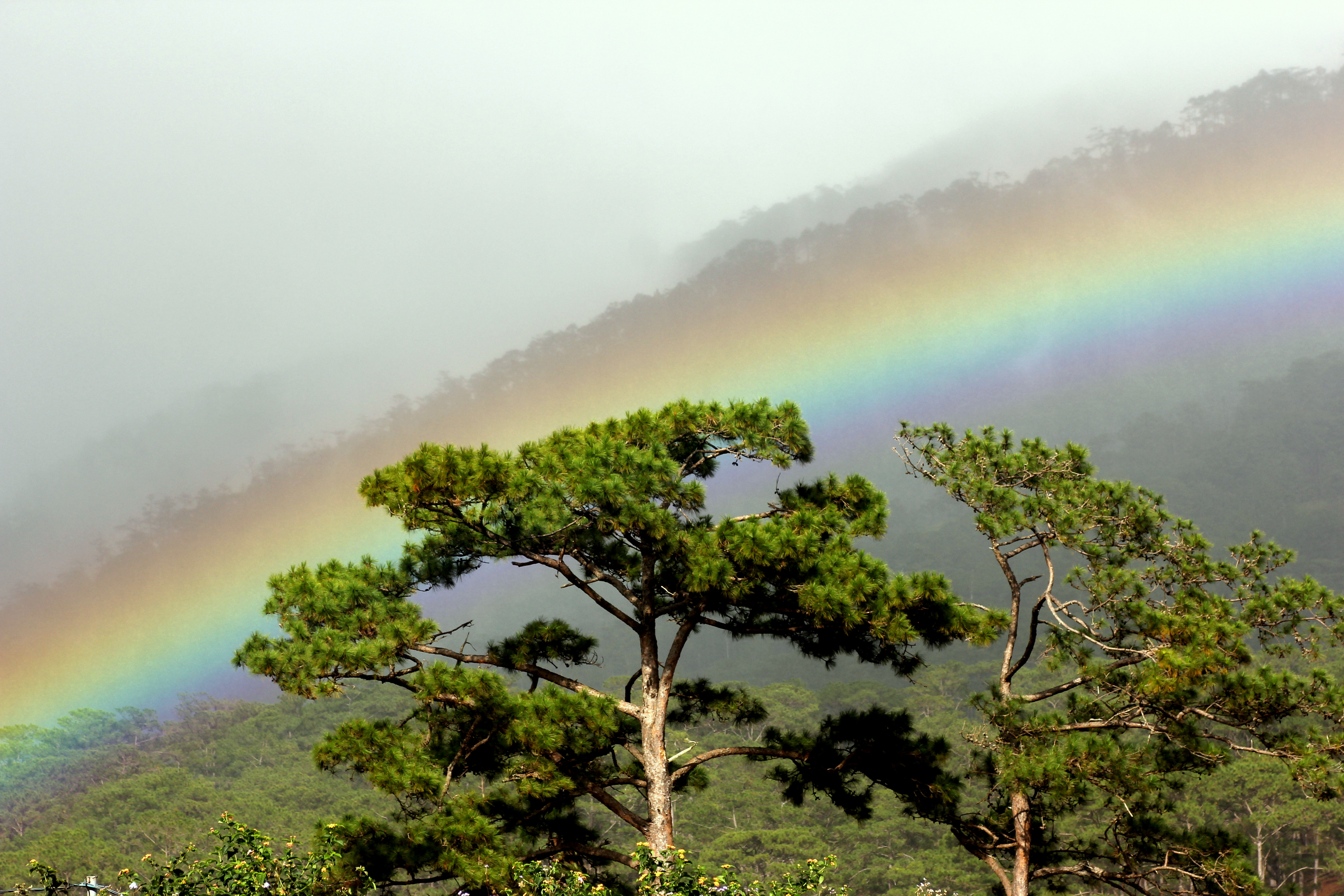
pine trees in Bidoup-Nui Ba National Park

The natural vegetation of the plateau is montane rain forest, part of the Southern Annamites montane rain forests ecoregion. Plant communities include mid-elevation broadleaf evergreen forest, broadleaf-coniferous mixed forest, high-elevation dwarf forest, mossy forest, bamboo, and savanna.

A total of 1,940 plant species belonging to 825 genera and 180 families have been recorded in Langbiang Biosphere Reserve, along with 89 species of mammals, 247 species of birds, 46 species of reptiles, 46 species of amphibians, 30 species of fish, and 335 species of insects. It is home to the endemic plant genus Langbiangia (3 species) and the endemic bamboo Schizostachyum langbianense.

=== Birds ===
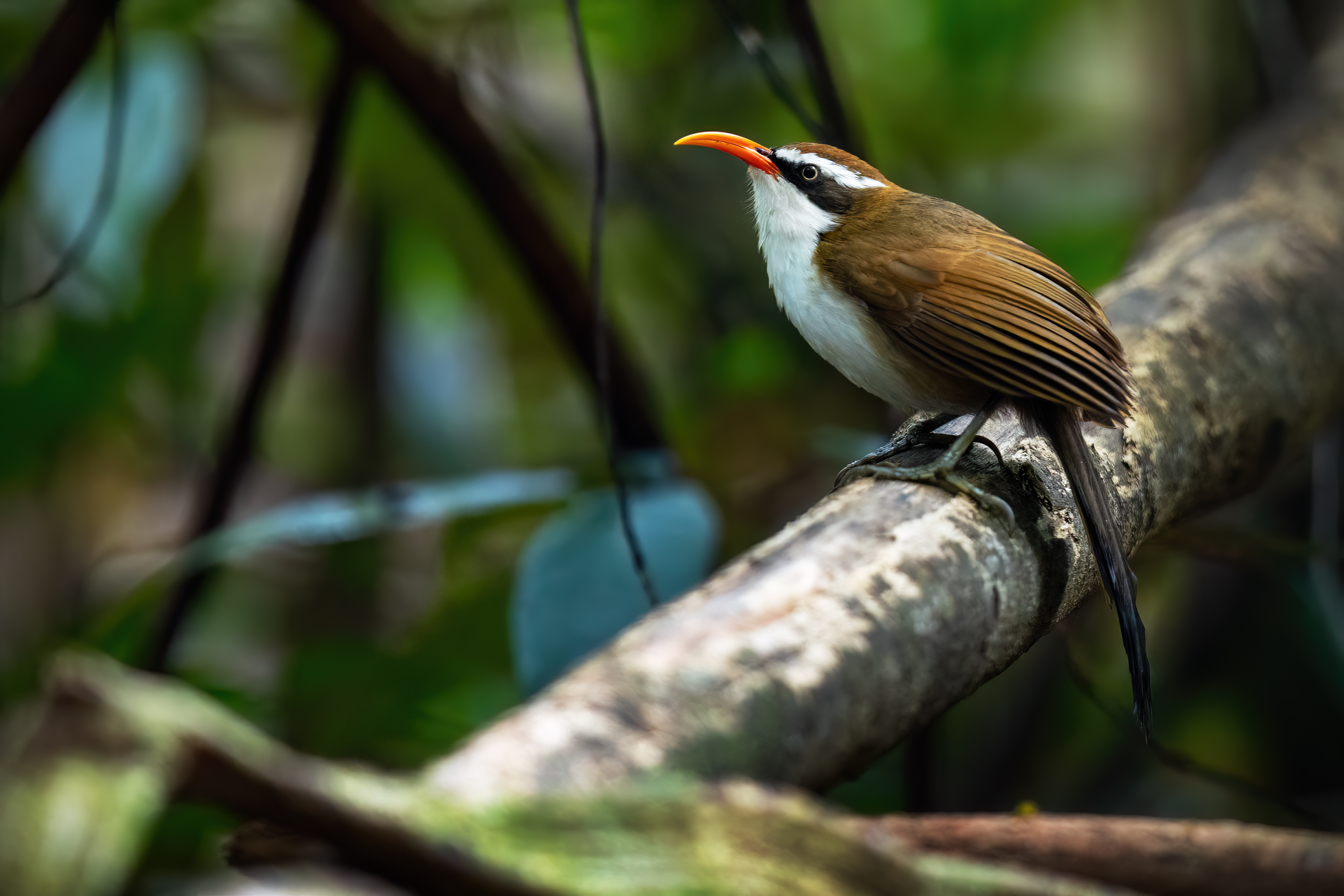
red-billed scimitar babbler (Pomatorhinus ochraceiceps)

The plateau has been designated as an Endemic Bird Area by BirdLife International. The plateau comprises a multitude of habitats for birds. Restricted-range species such as the Vietnamese crested argus (Rheinardia ocellata), short-tailed scimitar babbler (Jabouilleia danjoui), black-hooded laughingthrush (Garrulax milleti), white-cheeked laughingthrush (Garrulax vassali), collared laughingthrush (Garrulax yersini), grey-crowned crocias (crocias langbianis) and yellow-billed nuthatch (Sitta solangiae) inhabit the tropical montane broadleaf evergreen forest, the notable exception being the Vietnamese greenfinch (Carduelis monguilloti), which prefers pine forest. The varying elevations in the plateau also form a congenial environment for birds that are suited to low elevation (up to 1,650 m) such as the black-hooded laughingthrush and the grey-crowned crocias, which rarely ventures above 1,450 m, while the collared laughingthrush often inhabits the higher peaks of the region, reaching above 1,500 m.

=== Mammals ===
The Bidoup Núi Bà National Park, which is located in the northeastern section of the Đà Lạt Plateau, contains a significant number of mammalian species, totaling some 36 species of small mammals. Some of the notable creatures in this total include treeshrews (Tupaiidae), roundleaf bats (Hipposideridae), horseshoe bats (Rhinolophidae), squirrels (Sciuridae), bamboo rats (Spalacidae) and porcupines (Hystricidae). Large mammals include the Indochinese tiger (Panthera tigris tigris), sun bear (Helarctos malayanus), clouded leopard (Neofelis nebulosa), black-shanked douc (Pygathrix nigripes), gaur (Bos gaurus), yellow-cheeked gibbon (Nomascus gabriellae), and Annamese langur (Trachypithecus margarita).

== Conservation ==
Protected areas on the plateau include Bidoup-Nui Ba National Park (575.12 km^{2}), Phuoc Binh National Park (196.84 km^{2}), Rung Thong Da Lat Cultural and Historical Site (233.92 km^{2}), and Deo Ngoau Muc Nature Reserve (20.0 km^{2}).

In 2015 a portion of the plateau centered on Bidoup-Nui Ba National Park was designated the Langbiang Biosphere Reserve by UNESCO's Man and the Biosphere Programme.
