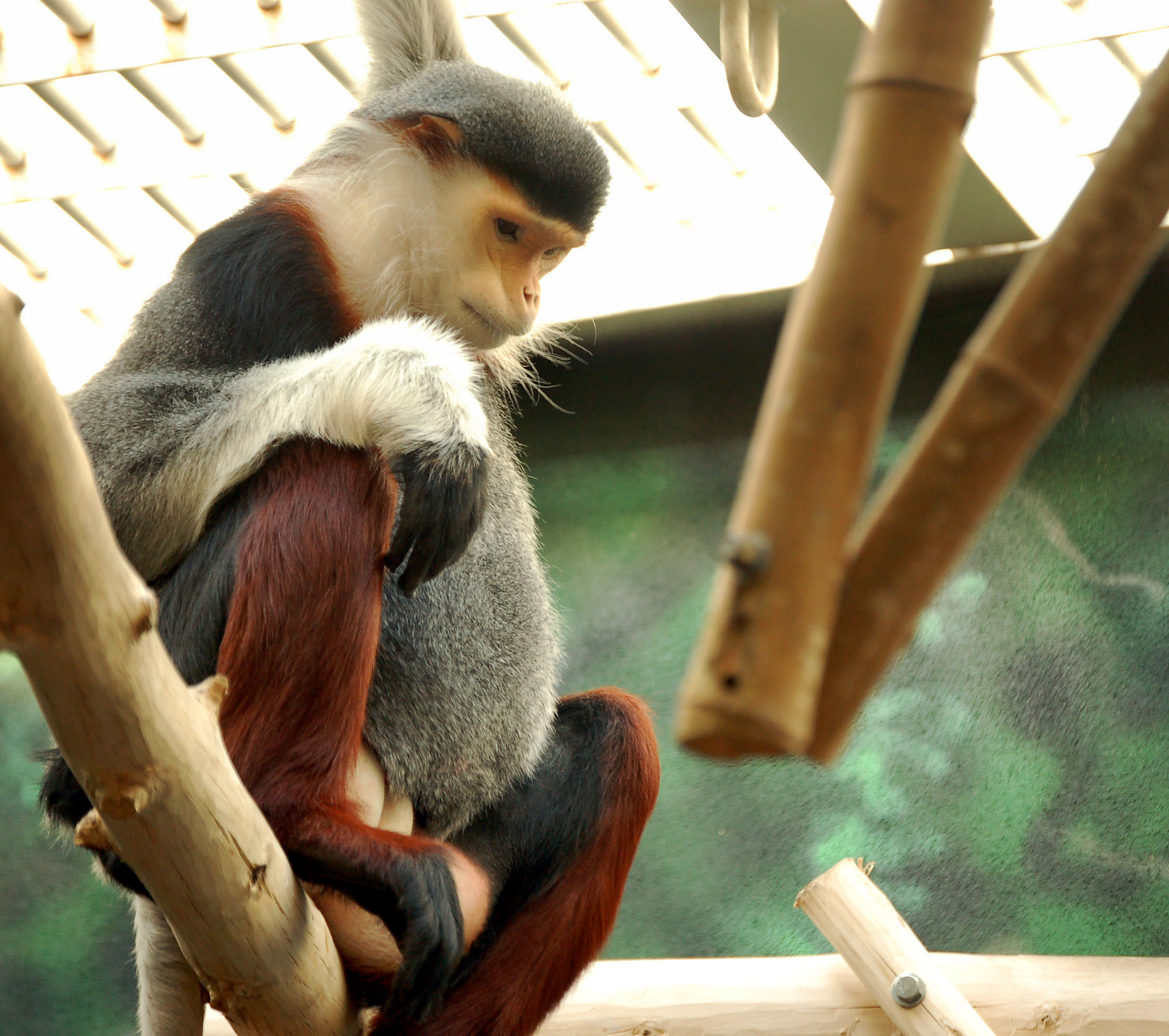
- Red-shanked douc (Pygathrix nemaeus) at the Philadelphia Zoo

Scientific classification
- Kingdom: Animalia
- Phylum: Chordata
- Class: Mammalia
- Infraclass: Placentalia
- Order: Primates
- Family: Cercopithecidae
- Subfamily: Colobinae
- Tribe: Presbytini
- Genus: Pygathrix; É. Geoffroy, 1812

Type species
- Simia nemaeus Linnaeus, 1771

Species
- See text

= Douc =

Genus of Old World monkeys

The doucs or douc langurs make up the genus Pygathrix. They are colobine Old World monkeys, native to Southeast Asia, consisting of 3 species: red-shanked douc, black-shanked douc, and gray-shanked douc.

== Description ==
The doucs are colobine Old World monkeys, which make up the genus Pygathrix. They are native to Southeast Asia.

== Classification ==
Even though they are known as "douc langurs", they are in fact more closely related to the proboscis monkey and snub-nosed monkeys than to any of the langurs. They are part of the subfamily Colobinae of the family Cercopithecidae.

Genus Pygathrix – Linnaeus, 1771 – three species
Common name	Scientific name and subspecies	Range	Size and ecology	IUCN status and estimated population
Black-shanked douc	P. nigripes (A. Milne-Edwards, 1871)	Southeastern Asia	Size: 60–76 cm (24–30 in) long, plus 56–76 cm (22–30 in) tail Habitat: Forest Diet: Leaves, as well as seeds, fruit and flowers	CR Unknown
Gray-shanked douc	P. cinerea Nadler, 1997	Southeastern Asia	Size: About 60 cm (24 in) long, plus 59–68 cm (23–27 in) tail Habitat: Forest Diet: Leaves, as well as buds, fruit, seeds, and flowers	CR Unknown
Red-shanked douc	P. nemaeus (Linnaeus, 1771)	Southeastern Asia	Size: 61–77 cm (24–30 in) long, plus 55–77 cm (22–30 in) tail Habitat: Forest Diet: Leaves, as well as unripe fruit, seeds, and flowers	CR Unknown

== Appearance ==
Doucs have a distinct appearance. The red-shanked douc characteristically has bright maroon legs and reddish patches around the eyes. In contrast, the grey-shanked douc is less vibrant, with speckled grey legs and orange markings on the face. Both have dappled grey bodies, black hands and feet and white cheeks, although the cheek hairs of the red-shanked douc are much longer. The black-shanked douc has black legs. Their long hind limbs and tail allow these monkeys to be very agile in their treetop habitat.

== Behavior ==
They live in small family groups headed by one adult male. A single group may have several adult females, and many children. Young males unaffiliated with a family group often make their own troops. Females usually bear a single offspring at a time, which is suckled for about a year.

== Sources ==
- Petter, Jean-Jacques; Desbordes, François (2013). Primates of the World: An Illustrated Guide. Princeton University Press. ISBN 978-0-691-15695-8.
