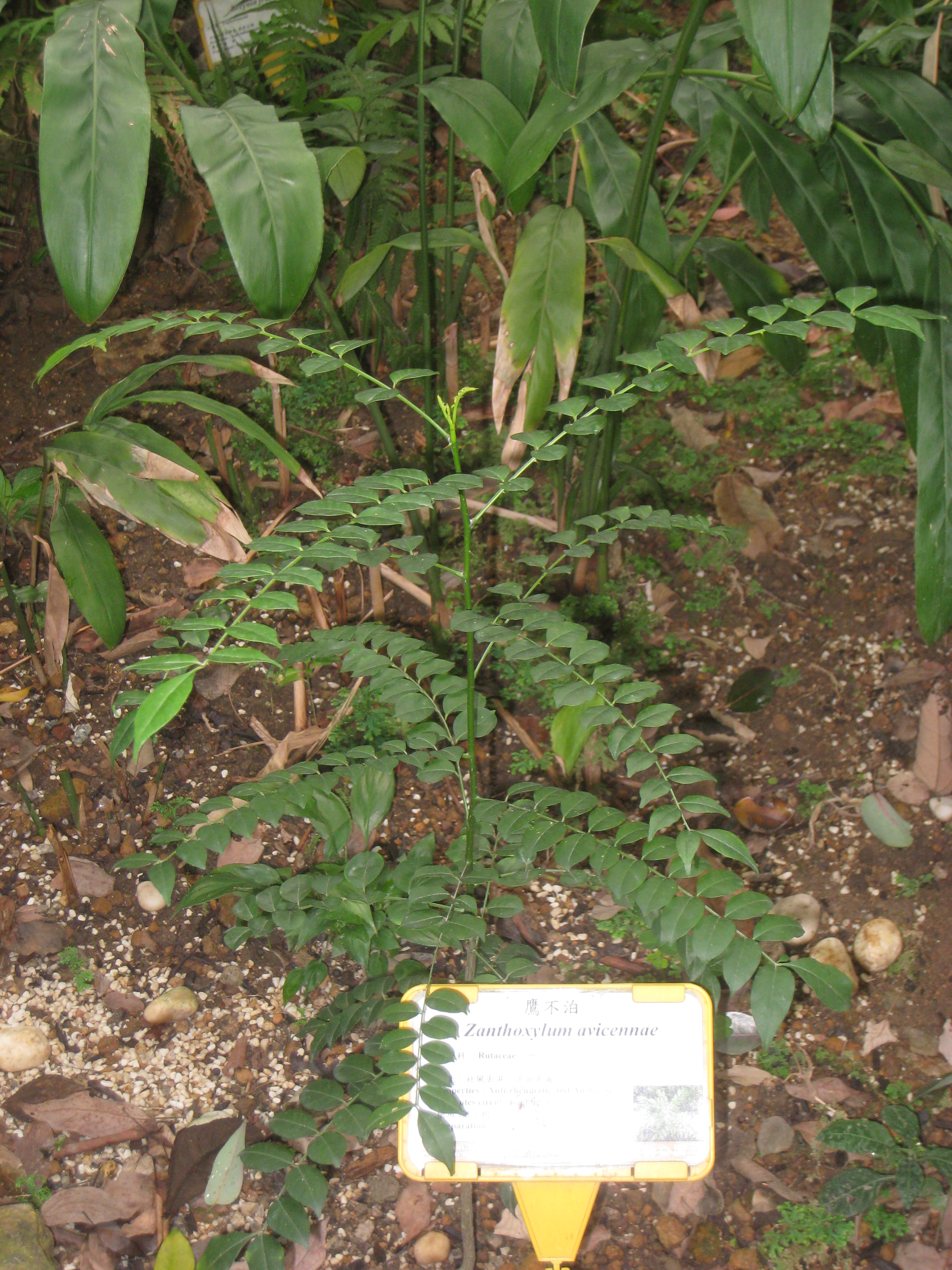

Scientific classification
- Kingdom: Plantae
- Clade: Embryophytes
- Clade: Tracheophytes
- Clade: Spermatophytes
- Clade: Angiosperms
- Clade: Eudicots
- Clade: Rosids
- Order: Sapindales
- Family: Rutaceae
- Genus: Zanthoxylum
- Species: Z. avicennae

Binomial name
- Zanthoxylum avicennae (Lam.) DC.

= Zanthoxylum avicennae =

Species of tree

Zanthoxylum avicennae is a woody plant in the family Rutaceae.

== Description ==
Z. avicennae is a deciduous tree that reaches 15 meters (49 ft) high. The trunk has chicken-foot-like thorns, the thorn base is oblate and thickened, shaped like a bulge, and displays ring patterns. The leaflets of the seedlings are very small, but as many as 31, on the branches of young trees. The leaves are densely thorny, and each part is glabrous. The leaves have 11–21 leaflets that are usually opposite or occasionally irregularly opposite, obliquely ovoid, obliquely rectangular or sickle-shaped, and are sometimes obovate. Seedling leaflets are mostly broad-ovate, 2.5–7 cm (1.0–2.8 in) long, 1–3 cm (0.4–1.2 in) wide, short pointed or blunt at the top, asymmetrical on both sides. It has sparsely cracked teeth on the whole or above the middle. The oil spots on fresh leaves are visible, while some are not obvious on the ventral surface of the leaf shaft. The leaf edges are narrow and green, and often narrow wing-shaped.

The inflorescence is terminal, with many flowers; the rachis and flowers are hard and sometimes purple-red. The male pedicel is 1–3 mm long. The sepals and petals are 5 mm. The sepals are broadly ovoid and green. The petals are yellow and white. The petals of the female flowers are slightly longer than those of the male flowers. About 2.5 mm long; male flowers have 5 stamens; 2 staminodes are lobed; female flowers have carpels 2 and rarely 3; staminodes are extremely small.

The fruit stalk is 3–6 mm long, and the total stalk is 1–3 times longer than the fruit stalk; the stalks are light-purple red, and the diameter of a single stalk is 4–5 mm. The top has no awn tip. The oil spots are large and many, slightly convex. The diameter of a seed is 3.5–4.5 mm. This tree flowers from June to August, fruits from October to December, and flowering in October.

The outer bark is off-white, while the inner bark is a light sulphur yellow. The root bark and wood are light yellow. This tree has a height of about 8 meters (26 ft) and the bark is 3–4 mm thick. the cork layer is quite thick. the wood is quite soft. Sometimes a five-petal parasitic Helixanthera parasitica Lour. parasitizes on its branches.

The fresh leaves, root bark and pericarp all have the smell of pepper, chewing sticky, bitter and numb. The pericarp and root bark have a strong flavor.

== Habitat ==
It is native to southern China's Fujian, Guangdong, Hainan, Guangxi, Macau, and Yunnan as well as Philippines, Northern Vietnam, and Taiwan. It is found in the area south of about 25° north latitude. It grows in low-altitude flat land, slope or valley and is more common in secondary forests.

== Applications ==
=== Traditional Chinese medicine ===
As a herbal medicine, it has the effects of expelling wind and dampness, promoting qi and resolving phlegm, and relieving pain. It can cure many types of pain and is also used as an ascaris repellent. The root water extract and alcohol extract have inhibitory effects on hemolytic streptococci and Staphylococcus aureus. The peel contains about 0.5% of essential oil; the leaf contains 0.3%. Main oils: terpinene, ylangene, α-pinene, etc. Root bark, stem bark and leaves contain alkaloids, including avicine, dihydroavicine, oxyavicine, nitidine, chelerythrine, magnoliflorine, δ-tembetarine, and candicine, as well as coumarins: avicennin, avicennol, diosmin and hesperidin.

The leaves, root and fruit can be used for medicine. The taste is slightly bitter. It is slightly toxic. It can improve blood circulation and increase urination frequency.
