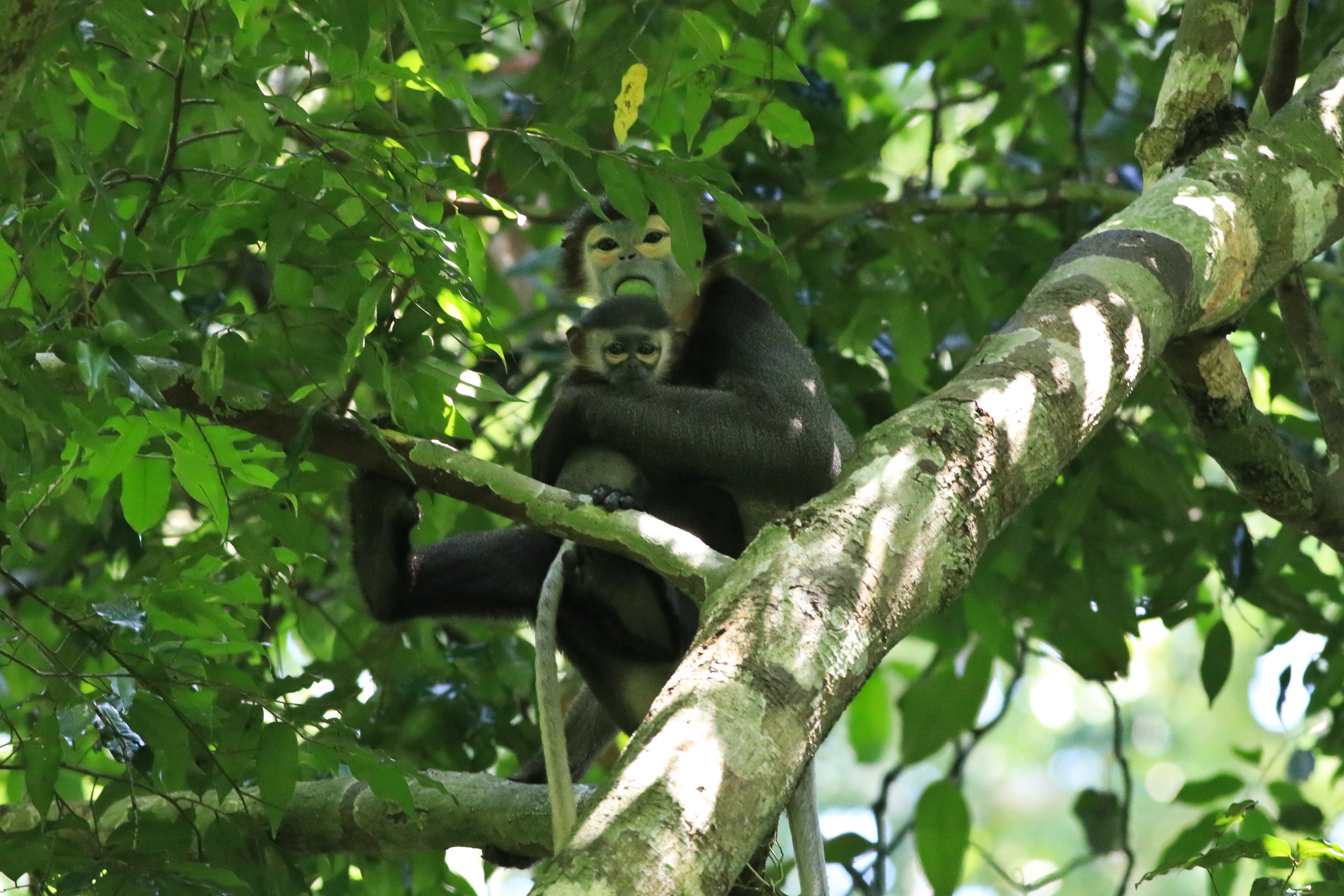
- Black-shanked douc with baby at Cát Tiên National Park

Conservation status
- Critically Endangered (IUCN 3.1)
- CITES Appendix I

Scientific classification
- Kingdom: Animalia
- Phylum: Chordata
- Class: Mammalia
- Order: Primates
- Family: Cercopithecidae
- Genus: Pygathrix
- Species: P. nigripes

Binomial name
- Pygathrix nigripes A. Milne-Edwards, 1871
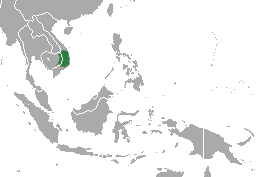
- Black-shanked douc range

= Black-shanked douc =

Species of Old World monkey

The black-shanked douc (Pygathrix nigripes) is an endangered species of douc found mostly in the forests of Eastern Cambodia, with some smaller populations in Southern Vietnam. The region they are mostly found in is called the Annamite Range, a mountainous area that passes through Cambodia and Vietnam. Its habitat is mostly characterized by evergreen forest in the mountains, in the middle to upper canopy. They move around quadrupedally and by brachiation up in the trees. This species is unique with its coloration among the doucs as it has a bluish face with yellow rings around its eyes a blue scrotum and a pink penis. Like other doucs, this species has a tail as long as its body and head length. Black-shanked douc have been observed in groups ranging from 3 to 30 individuals, depending on their habitat. Group tend to have a fission-fusion dynamic that changes with food availability. Their diet varies from dry to wet season. Regardless of the season, their diet consists mostly of leaves, but they have also been found to consume considerable amounts of fruits and flowers during wet season. The species changed conservation status in 2015 from endangered to critically endangered in the IUCN Red List of Endangered Species. This reassessment is due to an increase of the rate of population decline. No global population estimate exists. The majority of the population can be found in Cambodia, with smaller populations in Vietnam. In fact, the Wildlife Conservation Society reports almost 25,000 individuals in Cambodia's Keo Seima Wildlife Sanctuary, a population that has remained stable over the last decade. The largest populations estimated to be in Vietnam is around 500-600 individuals. The biggest challenges that the black-shanked douc faces in terms of conservation are habitat loss and illegal poaching. Conservation efforts are being made to control illegal poaching and trade in Vietnam by putting laws against hunting and trading threatened species.

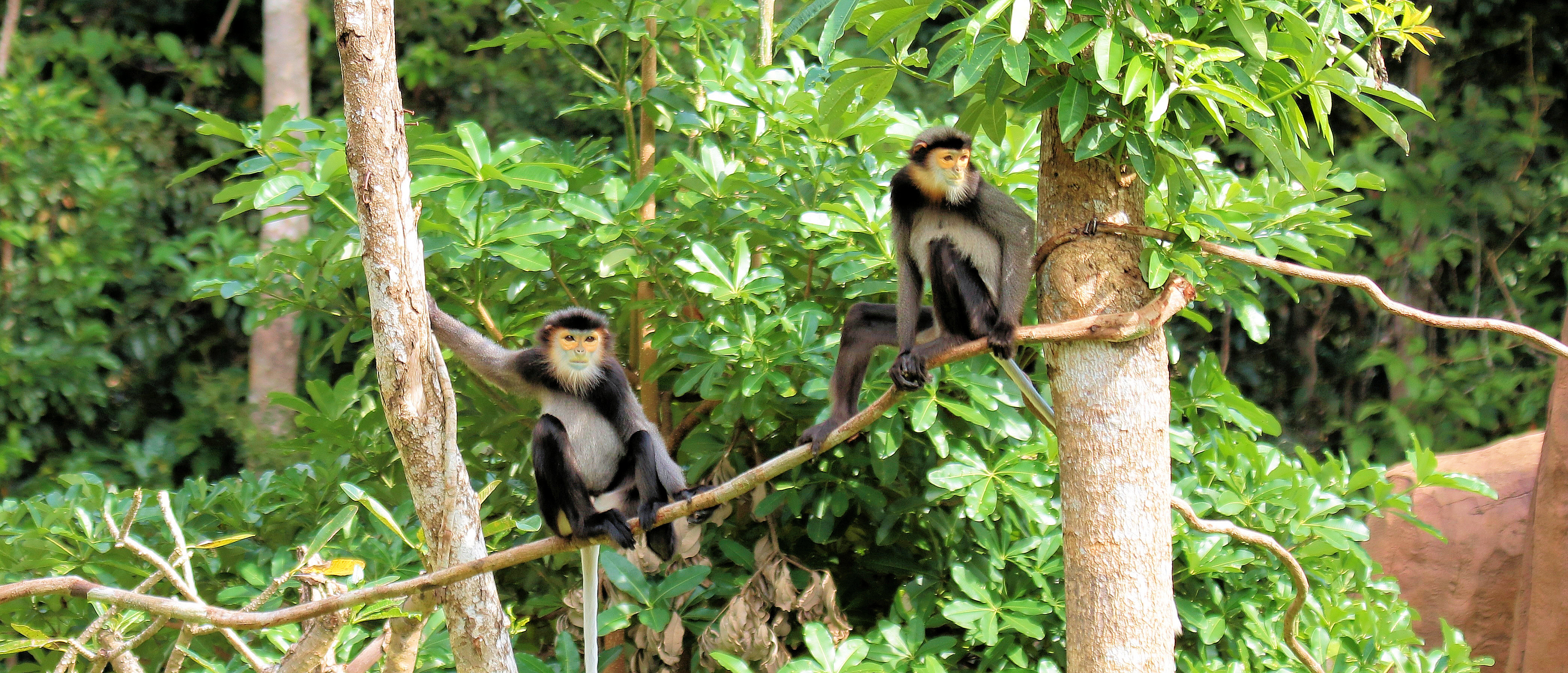
Black-shanked douc in Safery Phuquoc

== Geographic range and habitat ==
Species from the Pygathrix genus are all Indochina endemic species, that can be found in Cambodia, Laos, and Vietnam, but the black-shanked douc is only found in Cambodia and Vietnam. Studies on douc species have shown differentiation in ecological niche. The findings were that each douc species are spread out from North to South of Vietnam, each having their own latitudinal range. For the black-shanked douc, they estimated its geographic range is at a narrow latitudinal range of 11° N to 13.5°N, in Eastern Cambodia and Southern Vietnam. They can be found living in different types of forest: broad-leafed evergreen, semievergreen, mixed, dipterocarp lowland. More specifically, those species of the Pygathrix genus are mostly found in the Annamite Range, a mountainous landscape in Eastern Indochina. Like all douc species, the black-shanked douc is an arboreal species that moves around quadrupedally and through brachiation as locomotion. It is mostly found in the middle to upper forest canopy for most of the time. The range of elevation of the terrain where they have been seen goes from sea level to 1500 meters. However, most of the forest at lower elevation have been torn down over the years. Therefore, most sightings occur at higher elevations.

== Description ==
Like all species of Pygathrix, the black-shanked douc is characterized by its colorations. The colors on its head and neck are what differentiates the black-shanked douc from other species of the Pygathrix genus. Their most unique characteristic is their bluish face with large yellow eye-rings. It also has thin and short whiskers. The outline of its face has a thin chestnut coloration before the back of its head which is black. The region around its throat is white. Its back is dark grey. Its belly is light grey. Their rest of their body is black, which includes legs and arms, excluding the pubic patch area which is white, their scrotum is blue, and their penis is pink. While the majority of individuals have those standard colors, there has been color variations observed in few individuals, who were confirmed by genetic sampling to be black-shanked doucs. Amongst those observations, color variations occurred for the forearms which were partially or completely white and the lower leg which was dark red. Though it is not fully understood, an explanation for those color variations would be due to hybrid between douc species.

It has a tail as long as its body and head length. Few individuals were measured but the results for the male black-shanked douc had an average head and body length of 50 cm (20 in), an average tail length of 69 cm (27 in) and an average weight of 5.3 kg (12 lb). While the female black-shanked douc had an average head and body length of 56 cm (22 in) and an average weight of 5.4 kg (12 lb).

== Behaviour ==
Four major social units occur in the species: one-male units, bands comprising several one-male units, bachelor groups and lone males. In a study in Keo Seima Wildlife Sanctuary, one-male units averaged 7.5 individuals, and were composed of a single male, several females and offspring. Their social hierarchy is therefore male dominant. Black-shanked doucs have a fission-fusion social system, with fusion of one-male units into bands occurring more commonly in the wet season due to higher food availability. Group size can vary from 3 up to 35 individuals. The reason for such variability in size has been associated with the quality of their habitat and the level of human disturbance. Groups that were observed in the wild were of multi-male, multi-female disposition, with a higher ratio of males, the bigger the group was.

== Diet ==
Black-shanked doucs are mostly folivorous. Studies in Cambodia and Vietnam have shown their diet to consist primarily of leaves, from a wide diversity of plant species. Studies showed they consume as many as 150 different plant species, which shows they do not have particular preferences in plants, they consume whichever is available. Fruits, flowers, and seeds were reported as the remaining portion of their diet at various proportions, according to food availability. Indeed, studies found that their diet changed from dry season to wet season. During the dry season, the consumption of leaves increased, with a smaller amounts of other food consumed like flowers and fruits. During wet season, the consumption of leaves had higher diversity of plant species and the consumption of fruits and flowers was higher. This can be explained by Studies showed that variation of food intake also varied throughout the day. Leaves are consumed consistently throughout the day, but fruits are consumed more before midday, a habit common in folivorous non-human primate species for a more efficient energy intake needed in the morning.

== Conservation ==
In 2000, the black-shanked douc was assessed as Endangered by the IUCN Red List of Threatened Species due to the rate of its population decline. In 2015, its status was updated as Critically Endangered due to a more alarming rapid rate of population decline. The main drivers of the population decline for black-shanked doucs has been habitat loss and fragmentation. Other factors such as poaching and wildlife trade have been added as threatening factors for the conservation of this specie but they are not as detrimental as habitat loss.

Habitat loss and habitat fragmentation in Vietnam has been intensive during the 20th century due to deforestation. Following the Vietnam War, an increase in agricultural demands caused further deforestation. Increasing demands from the timber industry and mining industry also spurred deforestation. In addition, urbanization of areas in Vietnam have caused great habitat loss and fragmentation to convert forests into urban areas. Illegal conversion of protected areas into agricultural land like banana farms is still occurring in Vietnam.

Poaching, hunting and wildlife trade is the biggest threat to primates in Vietnam, as they are hunted and sold they can serve as food, medicine and pets. Even though those practices are illegal, they are still an issue in Vietnam and Cambodia. Conservation efforts have been made by establishing gun control laws, and prohibition of threatened species hunting and trade laws in Vietnam.

Climate change has also raised concern about the conservation of the black-shanked douc as endemic species tend to be more at risk of extinction due to climate change. Indeed, it has been modelled that black-shanked douc would be a vulnerable species with an increase of global average temperatures during the 21st century. Its spatial distribution currently does not cover a wide area and the species harbours a habitat that is currently getting more depleted. Therefore, habitat modelling of climate change has shown it will be difficult for black-shanked douc to find habitat suitable for their survival.
