= Outline of Vietnam =

Country in Southeast Asia

The Flag of Vietnam

The Coat of arms of Vietnam

The location of Vietnam

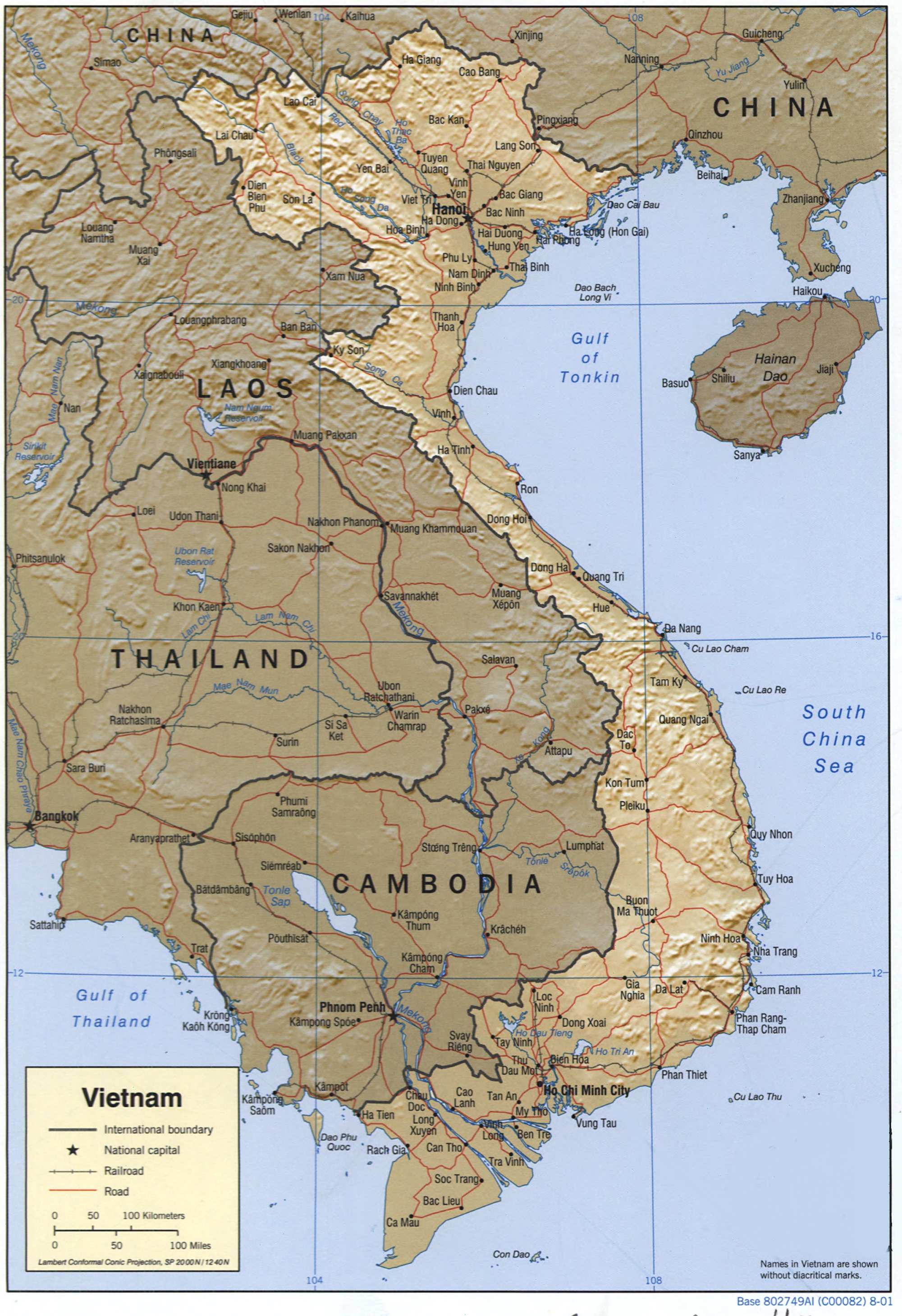
An enlargeable relief map of the Socialist Republic of Vietnam

The following outline is provided as an overview of and topical guide to Vietnam:

Vietnam – a sovereign country located on the eastern extent of the Indochinese Peninsula in Southeast Asia. It is bordered by China to the north, Laos to the northwest, Cambodia to the southwest, and the South China Sea to the east. With a population of over 98 million, Vietnam is the 15th most populous country in the world.

Vietnam was under Chinese control for a thousand years before becoming a nation-state in the 10th century. Successive dynasties flourished along with geographic and political expansion deeper into Southeast Asia, until it was colonized by the French in the mid-19th century. Efforts to resist the French eventually led to their expulsion from the country in the mid-20th century, leaving a nation divided politically into two countries. Bitter fighting between the two sides continued during the Vietnam War, ending with a communist victory in 1975.

Emerging from a long and bitter war, the war-ravaged nation was politically isolated. The government's centrally planned economic decisions hindered post-war reconstruction and its treatment of the losing side engendered more resentment than reconciliation. In 1986, it instituted economic and political reforms and began a path towards international reintegration. By 2000, it had established diplomatic relations with most nations. Its economic growth had been among the highest in the world in the past decade. These efforts culminated in Vietnam joining the World Trade Organization in 2007 and its successful bid to become a non-permanent member of the United Nations Security Council in 2008.

== General reference ==
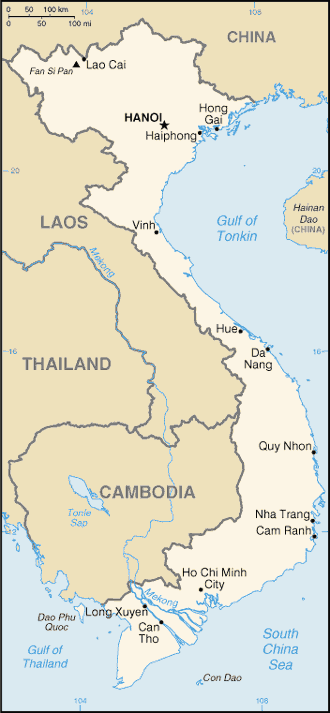
An enlargeable basic map of Vietnam

- Pronunciation: /ˌvɪjətˈnɑːm/ or /ˌvjɛtˈnɑːm/
  - Vietnamese: [viə̂ˀt nāːm]
- Common English country name: Vietnam or Viet Nam
- Official English country name: Socialist Republic of Vietnam
- Common endonym: Việt Nam
- Official endonym: Cộng hòa Xã hội Chủ nghĩa Việt Nam
- Adjectival: Vietnam, Vietnamese
- Demonym: Vietnamese
- Etymology: Name of Vietnam
- International rankings of Vietnam
- ISO country codes: VN, VNM, 704
- ISO region codes: See ISO 3166-2:VN
- Internet country code top-level domain: .vn
- Vietnam Directory

== Geography of Vietnam ==
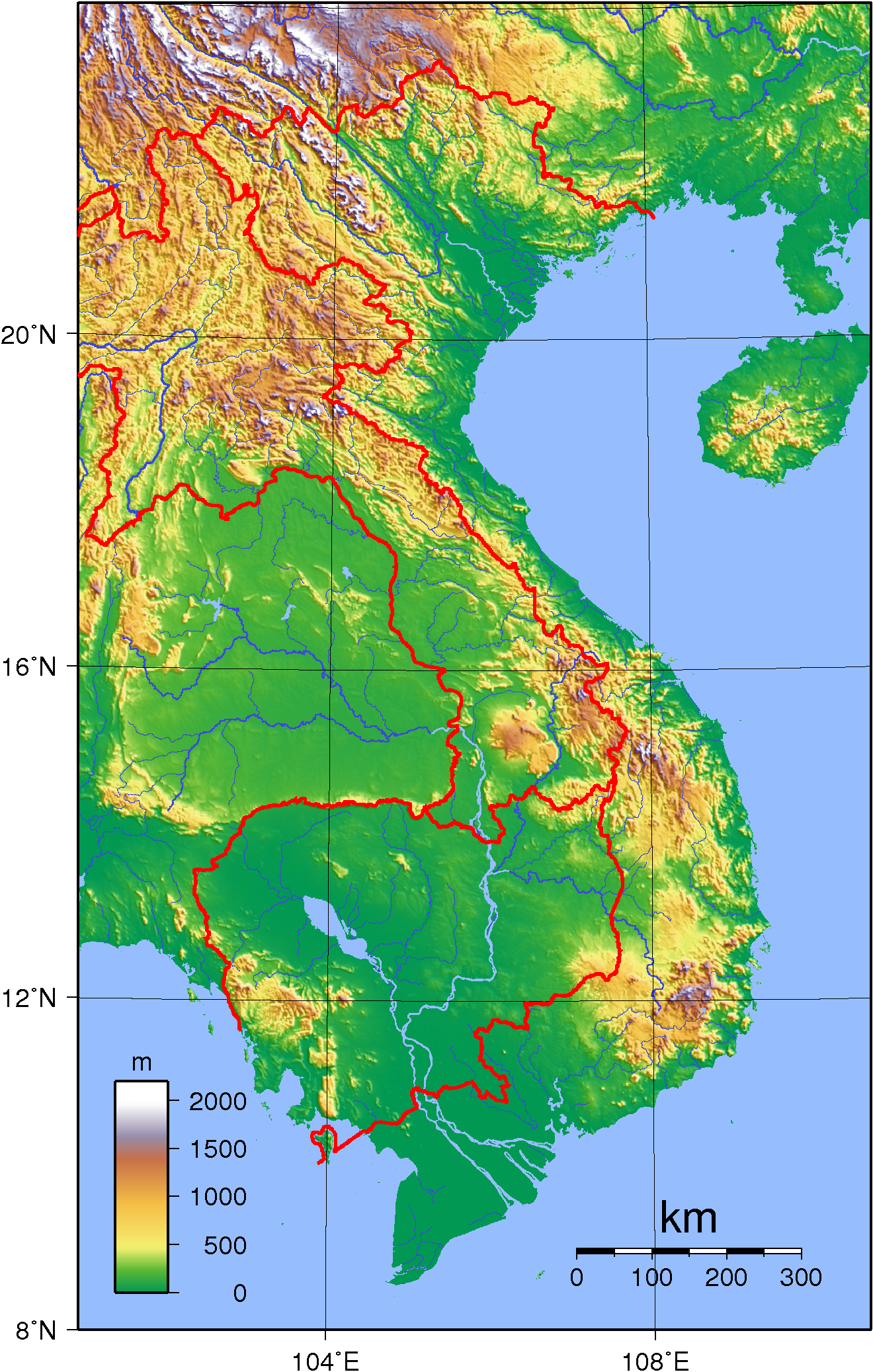
An enlargeable topographic map of Vietnam

- Vietnam is: a country
- Location:
  - Northern Hemisphere and Eastern Hemisphere
  - Eurasia
    - Asia
      - Southeast Asia
        - Indochina
  - Time zone: UTC+07
  - Extreme points of Vietnam
    - High: Fan Si Pan 3,143 m (10,312 ft)
    - Low: South China Sea 0 m
  - Land boundaries: 4,639 km

Laos 2,130 km
China 1,281 km
Cambodia 1,228 km

- Coastline: 3,444 km (excluding islands)

- Population of Vietnam:98.672.896 - 15th most populous country
- Area of Vietnam: 331,690 km^{2}
- Atlas of Vietnam

=== Environment of Vietnam ===
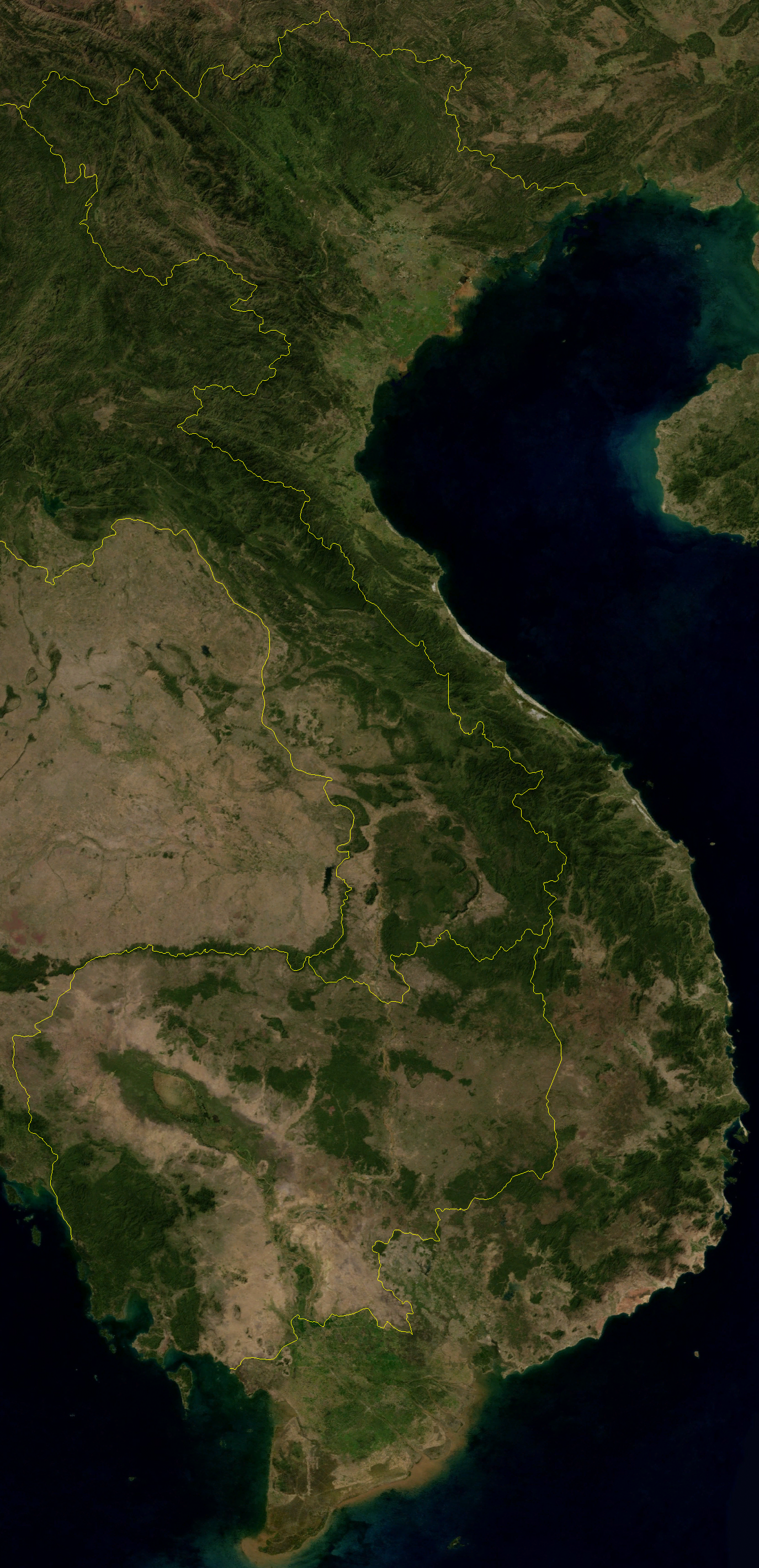
An enlargeable satellite image of Vietnam

Environment of Vietnam

- Climate of Vietnam
- Environmental issues in Vietnam
- Renewable energy in Vietnam
- Geology of Vietnam
- Protected areas of Vietnam
  - Biosphere reserves in Vietnam
  - National parks of Vietnam
- Wildlife of Vietnam
  - Fauna of Vietnam
    - Birds of Vietnam
    - Mammals of Vietnam

==== Natural geographic features of Vietnam ====
- Islands of Vietnam
- Lakes of Vietnam
- Mountains of Vietnam
  - Volcanoes in Vietnam
- Rivers of Vietnam
- List of World Heritage Sites in Vietnam

=== Regions of Vietnam ===
Regions of Vietnam

==== Ecoregions of Vietnam ====
List of ecoregions in Vietnam

==== Administrative divisions of Vietnam ====
- Regions of Vietnam
  - Provinces of Vietnam
    - Districts of Vietnam
    - Municipalities of Vietnam
    - Ward (Vietnam)
    - Commune (Vietnam)
    - Special zone (Vietnam)

The Vietnamese government often groups the various provinces into eight regions. These regions are not always used, and alternative classifications are possible.

- Northwestern (Tây Bắc)
- Northeastern (Đông Bắc)
- Greater Ha Noi – Red River Delta (Hà Nội Kinh-Đồng Bằng Sông Hồng)
- North Central Coast (Bắc Trung Bộ)
- South Central Coast (Nam Trung Bộ)
- Central Highlands (Tây Nguyên)
- Southeast (Đông Nam Bộ)
- Southwestern – Mekong River Delta (Tây Nam Bo Việt Nam-Đồng Bằng Sông Cửu Long)

=== Demography of Vietnam ===
Demographics of Vietnam

== Government and politics of Vietnam ==
- Form of government: single-party socialist republic
- Capital of Vietnam: Hanoi
- Elections in Vietnam
- Political parties in Vietnam

=== Branches of the government of Vietnam ===
Government of Vietnam

==== Executive branch of the government of Vietnam ====
- General Secretary of the Communist Party of Vietnam, Tô Lâm
- Head of state: President of Vietnam, Lương Cường
- Head of government: Prime Minister of Vietnam, Phạm Minh Chính
- Cabinet of Vietnam

==== Legislative branch of the government of Vietnam ====
- National Assembly of Vietnam (unicameral)

==== Judicial branch of the government of Vietnam ====
- Supreme People's Court of Vietnam
  - District Courts of Vietnam
    - Provincial People's Courts of Vietnam
  - Military tribunals of Vietnam
  - Administrative Court of Vietnam
  - Economic Court of Vietnam
  - Labor Court of Vietnam

=== Foreign relations of Vietnam ===
- Diplomatic missions in Vietnam
- Diplomatic missions of Vietnam

==== International organization membership ====
The Socialist Republic of Vietnam is a member of:

- Asian Development Bank (ADB)
- Asia-Pacific Economic Cooperation (APEC)
- Asia-Pacific Telecommunity (APT)
- Association of Southeast Asian Nations (ASEAN)
- Association of Southeast Asian Nations Regional Forum (ARF)
- Architects Regional Council Asia (ARCASIA)
- Colombo Plan (CP)
- East Asia Summit (EAS)
- Food and Agriculture Organization (FAO)
- Group of 77 (G77)
- International Atomic Energy Agency (IAEA)
- International Bank for Reconstruction and Development (IBRD)
- International Civil Aviation Organization (ICAO)
- International Criminal Police Organization (Interpol)
- International Development Association (IDA)
- International Federation of Red Cross and Red Crescent Societies (IFRCS)
- International Finance Corporation (IFC)
- International Fund for Agricultural Development (IFAD)
- International Labour Organization (ILO)
- International Maritime Organization (IMO)
- International Mobile Satellite Organization (IMSO)
- International Monetary Fund (IMF)
- International Olympic Committee (IOC)
- International Organization for Migration (IOM)
- International Organization for Standardization (ISO)
- International Red Cross and Red Crescent Movement (ICRM)
- International Telecommunication Union (ITU)
- International Telecommunications Satellite Organization (ITSO)
- Inter-Parliamentary Union (IPU)
- Multilateral Investment Guarantee Agency (MIGA)
- Nonaligned Movement (NAM)
- Organisation internationale de la Francophonie (OIF)
- Organisation for the Prohibition of Chemical Weapons (OPCW)
- United Nations (UN)
- United Nations Conference on Trade and Development (UNCTAD)
- United Nations Educational, Scientific, and Cultural Organization (UNESCO)
- United Nations Industrial Development Organization (UNIDO)
- Universal Postal Union (UPU)
- World Confederation of Labour (WCL)
- World Customs Organization (WCO)
- World Federation of Trade Unions (WFTU)
- World Health Organization (WHO)
- World Intellectual Property Organization (WIPO)
- World Meteorological Organization (WMO)
- World Tourism Organization (UNWTO)
- World Trade Organization (WTO)

=== Law and order in Vietnam ===
- Capital punishment in Vietnam
- Constitution of Vietnam
- Crime in Vietnam
- Human rights in Vietnam
  - LGBT rights in Vietnam
  - Freedom of religion in Vietnam
- Law enforcement in Vietnam
- Prosecution
  - Supreme People's Procuracy of Vietnam

=== Military of Vietnam ===
Military of Vietnam

- Command
  - Commander-in-chief: President of Vietnam
    - Ministry of Defence of Vietnam
- Forces
  - People's Army of Vietnam
  - Navy of Vietnam
  - Air Force of Vietnam
  - Special forces of Vietnam
- Military history of Vietnam
- Military ranks of Vietnam

=== Local government in Vietnam ===
Local government in Vietnam

== History of Vietnam ==
- Economic history of Vietnam
- Military history of Vietnam

== Culture of Vietnam ==
- Architecture of Vietnam
- Cuisine of Vietnam
- Vietnamese clothing
- Ethnic minorities in Vietnam
- Languages of Vietnam
- Media in Vietnam
- Museums in Vietnam
- National symbols of Vietnam
  - Coat of arms of Vietnam
  - Flag of Vietnam
  - National anthem of Vietnam
- People of Vietnam
- Prostitution in Vietnam
- Public holidays in Vietnam

=== Art in Vietnam ===
- Cinema of Vietnam
- Literature of Vietnam
- Music of Vietnam
- Television in Vietnam
- Theatre in Vietnam

=== Religion in Vietnam ===
- Buddhism in Vietnam
- Christianity in Vietnam
- Hinduism in Vietnam
- Islam in Vietnam
- Judaism in Vietnam

=== Sport in Vietnam ===
- Football in Vietnam
- Vietnam at the Olympics

== Economy and infrastructure of Vietnam ==
- Economic rank, by nominal GDP (2007): 59th (fifty-ninth)
- Agriculture in Vietnam
- Banking in Vietnam
  - State Bank of Vietnam (central bank)
- Communications in Vietnam
  - Internet in Vietnam
- Companies of Vietnam
- Currency of Vietnam: Dồng
  - ISO 4217: VND
- Economic history of Vietnam
- Energy in Vietnam
- Five-Year Plans of Vietnam
- Health care in Vietnam
- Tourism in Vietnam
- Transport in Vietnam
  - Airports in Vietnam
  - Rail transport in Vietnam
- Water supply and sanitation in Vietnam

== See also ==
Vietnam

- List of international rankings
- List of Vietnam-related topics
- Member state of the United Nations
- Outline of Asia
- Outline of geography
