= Geology of Vietnam =

The geology of Vietnam is divided into five structural blocks : Northeast (NE), Northwest (NW), Truongson, Kon Tum and Nambo. The NE block is a part of the South China plate, in which strata and igneous rocks have been found dating from the Early Paleozoic to the Quaternary. The NW and Truongson blocks are regarded as NW-SE trending Paleozoic folded systems filled with thick (>12000 m) Paleozoic formations. Precambrian strata are widespread in the Red River Fault zone and Fansipan range in the NW block, and in the Kon Tum block. Archean rocks are found only in the Kon Tum block, which is regarded as a stable massif without Paleozoic sedimentary rocks. The Nambo block is covered with a very thick (>6000 m) sequence of Cenozoic formations deposited in a continental rift. During the Mesozoic many such graben structures were formed and become basins for sedimentation. Igneous activity in Vietnam is divided into five episodes from the Archean to Quaternary. The most important impediments to the description and interpretation of geology in Vietnam are lack of reliable radiometric and structural data, and scarcity of good outcrops.

== Mining ==
Vietnam's mineral resources, apart from offshore oil and gas, include phosphate, coal, bauxite, base and precious metals, and a variety of industrial minerals. More than 5,000 mineral occurrences have been identified. Five broadly defined metallogenic epochs have been recognised and, in general, the younger the setting the more abundant the deposits. Only a few are hosted by Precambrian rocks, principally iron, gold and graphite. The early to mid-Palaeozoic contains small deposits of iron ore, lead–zinc and large deposits of potash. Larger deposits of iron ore, ilmenite, gold, nickel–copper and bauxite were formed during the early Carboniferous/late Triassic.

== Geothermal energy ==
In the territory of Vietnam, more than 300 natural geothermal sources have been recorded and six geothermal regions have been defined: Northwest, Northeast, Bac Bo plan, North central part, South central part, and Southern plain. Vietnam has a remarkable potential for geothermal resources. Especially, Northwestern Vietnam is the most prospective region for geothermal exploration and development. Dr. Doan Van Tuyen from the Institute of Geological Sciences of the Vietnamese Academy of Science and Technology commented, "Compared with the rest of the world, Vietnam has medium potential for geothermal energy development. However, geothermal energy resources are available not just in one place, but throughout the country. Therefore, most localities can make use of this type of energy."

== Volcanic activity ==
Vietnam has 6 volcanoes, Bas Đồng Nai, Cu-Lao Re Group, Haut Đồng Nai, Toroeng Prong, Veteran and Ile des Cendres which had the most recent eruption in 1923.

== Geological parks ==
The Dong Van Highlands, encompassing total area of more than 574 square kilometers in Hà Giang Province's Quản Bạ, Yên Minh, Đồng Văn and Mèo Vạc districts, could eventually be recognized as a UNESCO Global Geological Park.

UNESCO Vietnam has sent an application based on a recent study which concluded that limestone can be found in 11 layers on 80 percent of the surface of the plateau. Two of the layers are sediment dating from 400 to 600 million years ago. It will be only the second geological park in Southeast Asia after Langkawi Geological Park in Malaysia and the 54th in the world.
