= Hinduism in Southeast Asia =

Hindus of Southeast Asia
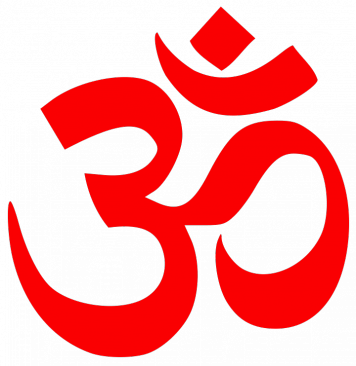

- Expansion of Hinduism in Southeast Asia

Total population
- c. 7.27 million▲ (1.1% of the total Southeast Asian population)

Regions with significant populations
- Indonesia: 4,781,776
- Malaysia: 1,949,850
- Singapore: 260,000
- Myanmar: 189,718
- Vietnam: 70,000

Languages
- Sacred language: Sanskrit and Tamil (to some extent); Predominant spoken languages: Balinese; Tamil; Javanese; Tenggerese; Osing; Cham; Indonesian; Malay; other Southeast Asian languages; English; and others

Hinduism in Southeast Asia had a profound impact on the region's cultural development and its history. As the Indic scripts were introduced from the Indian subcontinent, people of Southeast Asia entered the historical period by producing their earliest inscriptions around the 1st to 5th century CE. Today, Hindus in Southeast Asia are mainly Overseas Indians and Balinese. There are also Javanese (also other minorities of Indonesia), and the Balamon Cham minority in South Central Vietnam who also practice Hinduism.

Hindu civilization, which itself formed from various distinct cultures and peoples, including also early Southeast Asian, specifically Mon Khmer influences, was adopted and assimilated into the indigenous social constructs and statehoods of Southeast Asian regional polities. Through the formation of Indianized kingdoms, small indigenous polities led by petty chieftain were transformed into major kingdoms and empires led by a Maharaja with statecraft akin to India’s. This gave birth to the Champa civilisation in South Central Vietnam, the Funan Kingdom in Southern Vietnam, the Khmer Empire in Indochina, the Langkasuka Kingdom and Old Kedah in the Malay Peninsula, the Sriwijayan kingdom on Sumatra, the Mataram kingdom, Singhasari and the Majapahit Empire based in Java, Bali and parts of the Philippine archipelago. The civilisation of India influenced the languages, scripts, written traditions, literatures, calendars, belief systems and artistic aspects of these peoples and nations.

A reason for the acceptance of Indian culture and religious traditions in Southeast Asia was because Indian culture already bore some striking similarities to indigenous cultures of Southeast Asia, which can be explained by earlier Southeast Asian (specifically Austroasiatic, such as early Munda and Mon Khmer groups) and Himalayan (Tibetic) cultural and linguistic influence on local Indian peoples. Several scholars, such as Professor Przyluski, Jules Bloch, and Lévi, among others, concluded that there is a significant cultural, linguistic, and political Mon-Khmer (Austroasiatic) influence on early Indian culture and traditions. India is seen as a melting pot of western, eastern and indigenous traditions.

== Ancient era ==
Indian scholars wrote about the Dwipantara or Jawa Dwipa Hindu kingdom in Java and Sumatra around 200 BC. "Yawadvipa" is mentioned in India's earliest epic, the Ramayana. Sugriva, the chief of Rama's army, dispatched his men to Yawadvipa, the island of Java, in search of Sita. It was hence referred to by the Sanskrit name "yāvaka dvīpa" (dvīpa = island). Southeast Asia was frequented by traders from eastern India, particularly Kalinga, as well as from the kingdoms of South India. The Indianised Tarumanagara kingdom was established in West Java around 400s, and produced inscriptions among the earliest in Indonesian history. There was a marked Buddhist influence starting about 425 in the region. Around the 6th century, the Indianized Kalingga kingdom was established on the northern coast of Central Java. The name of the kingdom was derived from Kalinga east coast of India. These Southeast Asian seafaring peoples engaged in extensive trade with India and China, which attracted the attention of the Mongols, Chinese and Japanese, as well as Islamic traders, who reached the Aceh area of Sumatra in the 12th century. Medieval Indian scholars also referred to the Philippines as "Panyupayana" (The lands surrounded by water).

Indian Hindu influence began declining around the 11th century, though traces of Hinduism remained in places like Java well into the 16th century, while Bali retained such influences to the modern day.

Examples of the Hindu cultural influence found today throughout Southeast Asia owe much to the legacy of the Chola dynasty. For example, the great temple complex at Prambanan in Indonesia exhibits a number of similarities with the South Indian architecture.

According to the Malay chronicle Sejarah Melayu, the rulers of the Malacca Sultanate claimed to be descendants of the kings of the Chola Empire. Chola rule is remembered in Malaysia today as many princes there have names ending with Cholan or Chulan, one such being Raja Chulan, the Raja of Perak.

The Chola school of art also spread to Southeast Asia and influenced the architecture and art of Southeast Asia.

Some scholars have pointed out that the legends of Ikshvaku and Sumati may have their origin in the Southeast-Asian myth of the birth of humanity from a bitter gourd. The legend of Sumati, the wife of King Sagar, tells that she produced offspring with the aid of a bitter gourd.

== Modern era ==
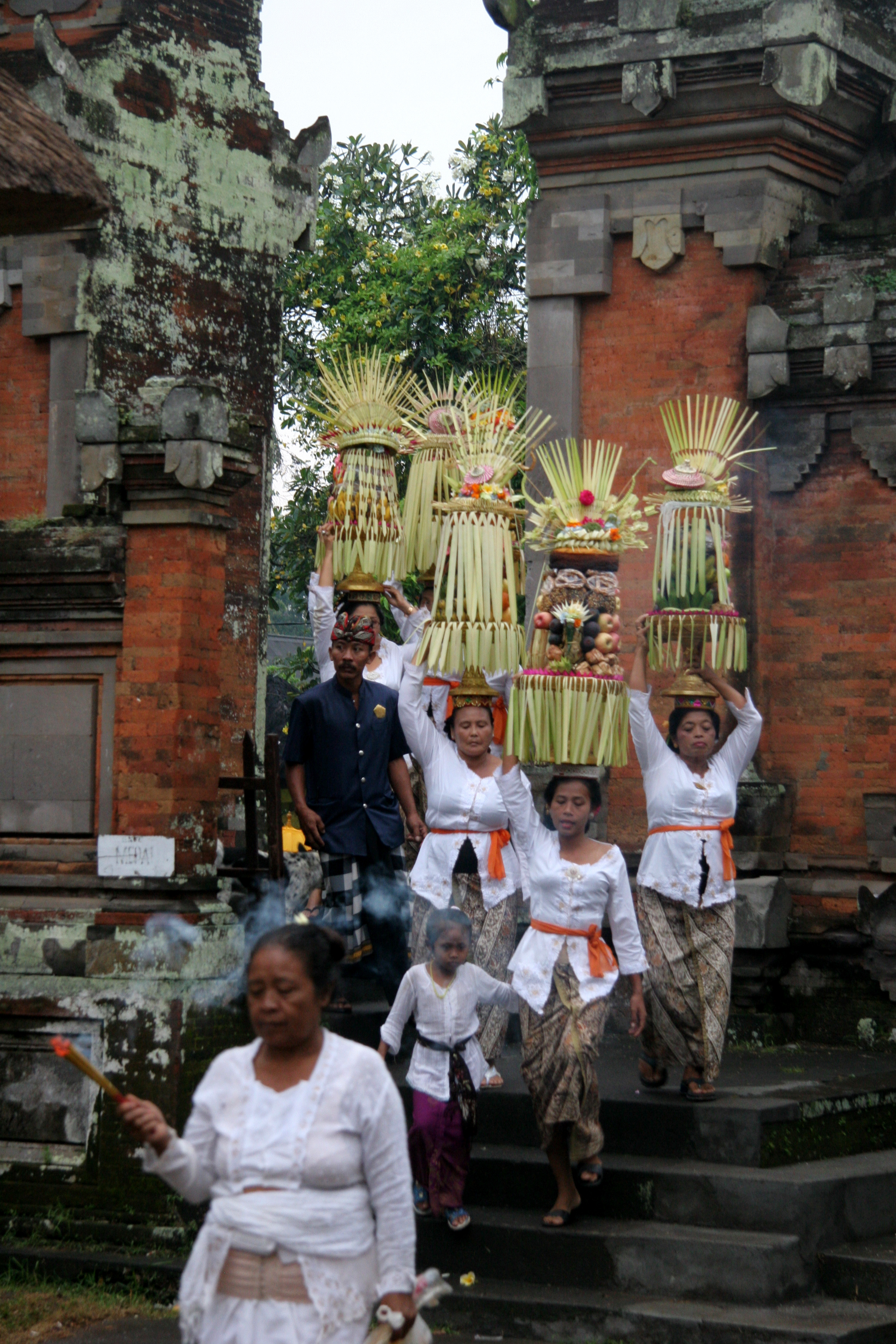
The Hindu Balinese temple offering in Bali, Indonesia

Today, vibrant and diverse Hindu communities spread across Southeast Asia, remaining especially in Malaysia, Singapore, Thailand, Medan (Indonesia) and the Philippines, mainly due to the presence of Tamil people, who migrated from the Indian subcontinent to Southeast Asia in past centuries. One notably Southeast Asian aspect of Tamil Hinduism is the festival of Thaipusam, while other Hindu religious festivals such as Diwali are also well-observed by Hindus in the region. In Thailand and Cambodia, Thai and Khmer people practised Hindu rituals and traditions along with their Buddhist faith, and Hindu gods such as Brahma are still widely revered.

In Indonesia, it is not only people of Indian descent who practice Hinduism; Hinduism still survives as the major religion in Bali, where native Indonesians, the Balinese people, adhere to Agama Hindu Dharma, a variant of Hinduism derived from ancient Java-Bali Hindu traditions developed in the island for almost two millennia, often incorporating native spiritual elements. Other than the Balinese, small enclaves of Javanese Hindu minorities are also can be found in Java, such as around Tengger mountain ranges near Bromo and Semeru volcanoes, Karanganyar Regency in Central Java, and near Prambanan, Yogyakarta. Similarly, Hinduism is also found among the Cham minority in Southern Vietnam and Cambodia: just like the Javanese, the majority of them are Muslims but a minority are Hindu. In other parts of Indonesia, the term Hindu Dharma is often loosely used as an umbrella category to identify native spiritual beliefs and indigenous religions such as Hindu Kaharingan professed by Dayak of Kalimantan.

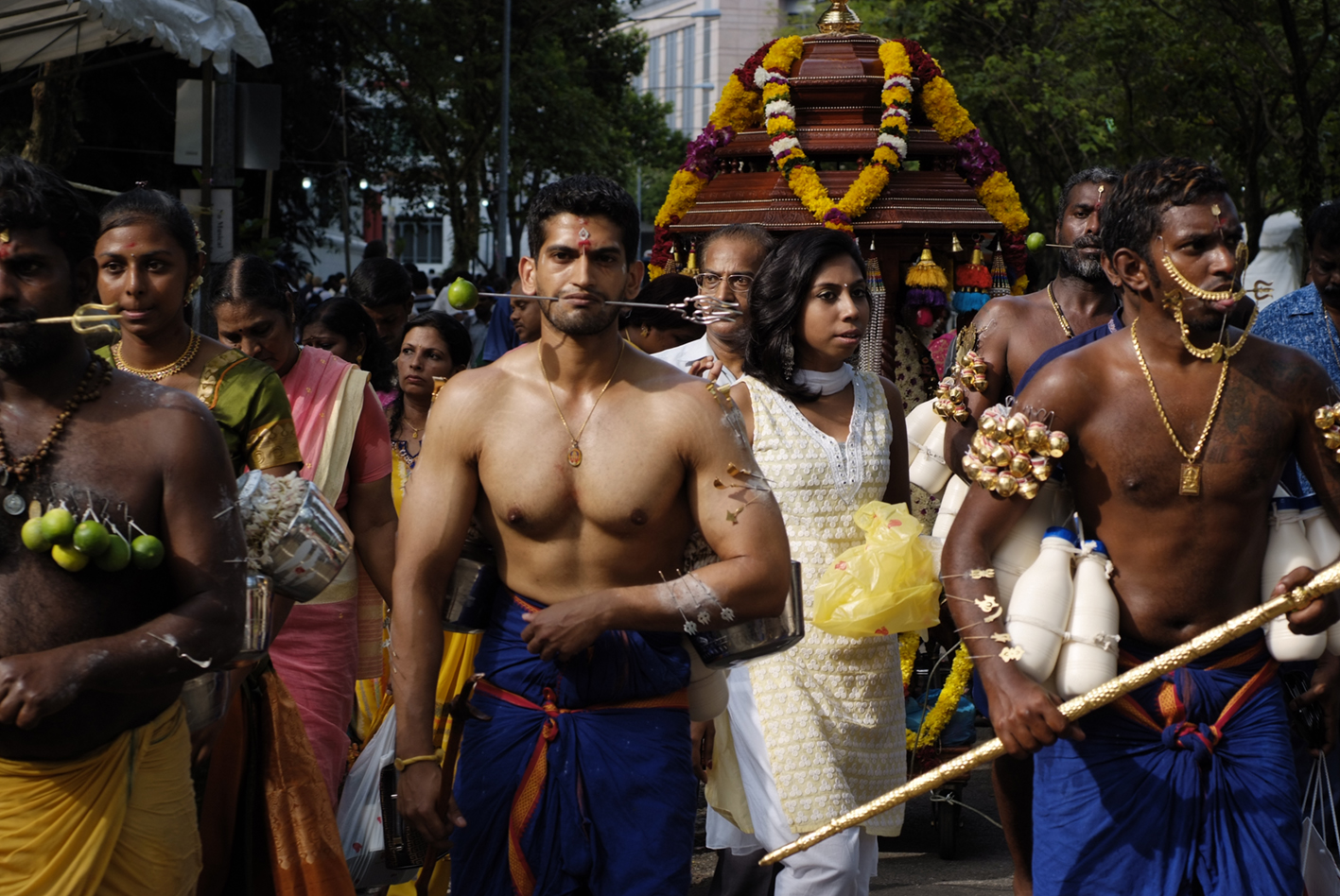
Hindu devotees during Thaipusam festival in Singapore

The resurgence of Hinduism in Indonesia is occurring in all parts of the country. In the early 1970s, the Toraja people of Sulawesi were the first to be identified under the umbrella of 'Hinduism', followed by the Karo Batak of Sumatra in 1977 and the Ngaju Dayak of Kalimantan in 1980. In an unpublished report in 1999, the National Indonesian Bureau of Statistics admitted that around 100,000 people had officially converted or 'reconverted' from Islam to Hinduism over the previous two decades.

The Ministry of Religious Affairs, as of 2007, estimated there were at least 10 million Hindus in Indonesia.

The growth of Hinduism has been driven also by the famous Javanese prophecies of Sabdapalon and Jayabaya. Many recent converts to Hinduism had been members of the families of Sukarno's PNI, and now support Megawati Sukarnoputri. This return to the 'religion of Majapahit’ (Hinduism) is a matter of nationalist pride.

Next to Indonesian Balinese, the Balamon Cham are now the only surviving native (non-Indic) Hindus in Southeast Asia. In Vietnam there are roughly 160,000 members of the Cham ethnic minority. The majority of them adhere to Islam while some are Hindus. After centuries being dominated by Kinh (Vietnamese), today there are some efforts to revive Cham culture.

== Countries ==
Percentage of Hindus by country
| Country | Percentage |
| Malaysia | 6.1 |
| Singapore | 5.4 |
| Indonesia | 1.7 |
| Myanmar | 0.6 |
| Cambodia | 0.3 |
| Thailand | 0.1 |
| Laos | 0.09 |
| Vietnam | 0.07 |
| Philippines | 0.03 |
| Brunei | 0.02 |
| East Timor | 0.013 |

Hinduism is a minority religion of Southeast Asia with a sizeable population in Indonesia, Malaysia, Singapore and Myanmar. Indonesia has the fourth largest Hindu population of the world, mostly residing on the island of Bali.

=== Brunei ===
Through allegiance to the Majapahit Empire, Hinduism was influential among the ruling classes and partially adopted by the locals.

=== Cambodia ===
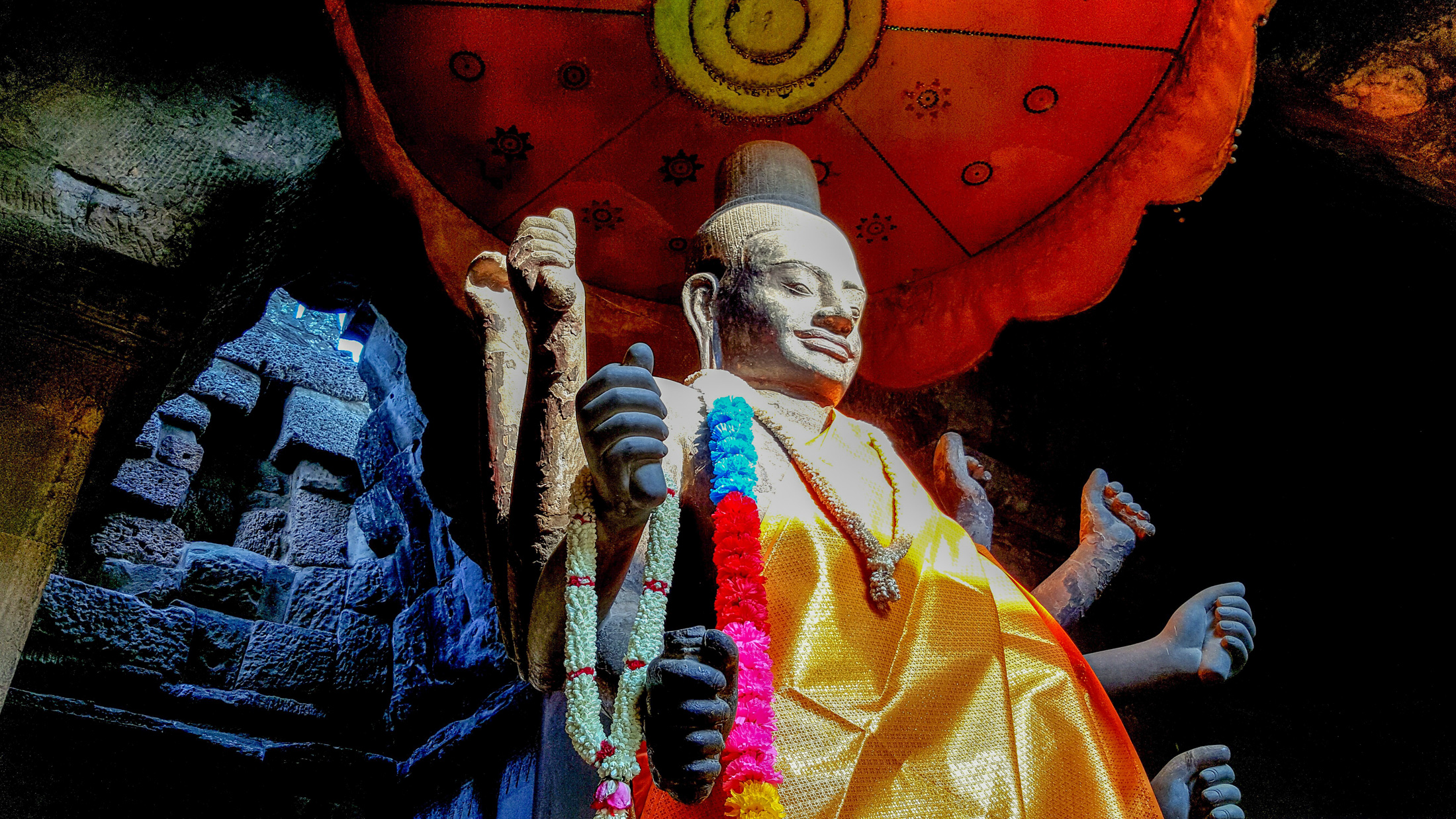
Statue of Buddha at Angkor Wat, converted from a statue of Vishnu

Cambodia was first influenced by Hinduism during the beginning of the Kingdom of Funan. Hinduism was one of the Khmer Empire's official religions. Angkor Wat, the largest temple complex in the world (now Buddhist) was once a Hindu temple. The main religion adhered to in Khmer kingdom was Hinduism, followed by Buddhism in popularity. Initially, the kingdom followed Hinduism as its main state religion.

The Mahadeva's Vishnu and Shiva were the most revered deities worshipped in Khmer Hindu temples. Temples such as Angkor Wat are actually known as Preah Pisnulok (Vara Vishnuloka in Sanskrit) or the realm of Vishnu, to honour the posthumous King Suryavarman II as Vishnu. Hindu ceremonies and rituals performed by Brahmins (Hindu priests), typically only remained among the ruling elites of the king's family, nobles, and the ruling class.

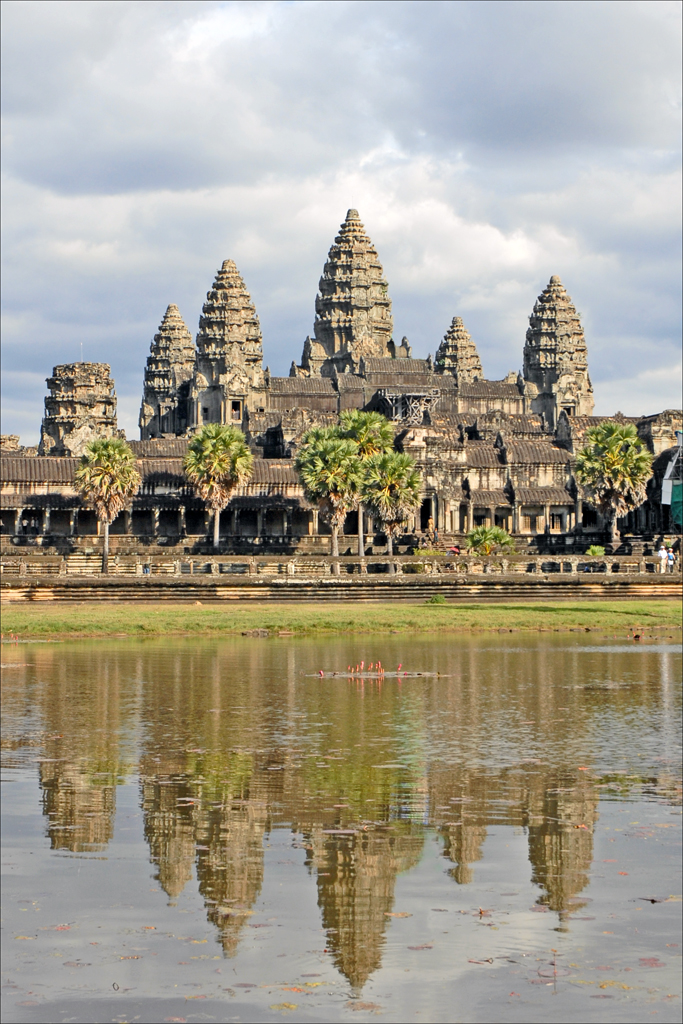
Angkor Wat, in Cambodia, is one of the hundreds of ancient Hindu temples in Southeast Asia.

The Khmer Empire has developed a complex society where sophisticated culture, art, and architecture flourish. The Khmer king and his officials were in charge of irrigation management and water distribution, which consisted of an intricate series of hydraulics infrastructure, such as canals, moats, and massive reservoirs called barays. Society was arranged in a hierarchy reflecting the Hindu caste system, where the commoners – rice farmers and fishermen – formed the large majority of the population. The kshatriyas – royalty, nobles, warlords, soldiers, and warriors – formed a governing elite and authorities. Other social classes included brahmins (priests), traders, artisans such as carpenters and stonemasons, potters, metalworkers, goldsmiths, and textile weavers, while on the lowest social level are slaves. The extensive irrigation projects provided rice surpluses that could support a large population. The state religion was Hinduism but influenced by the cult of Devaraja, elevating the Khmer kings as possessing the divine quality of living gods on earth, attributed to the incarnation of Vishnu or Shiva. In politics, this status was viewed as the divine justification of a king's rule. The cult enabled the Khmer kings to embark on massive architectural projects, constructing majestic monuments such as Angkor Wat and Bayon to celebrate the king's divine rule on earth.

The empire's official religions included Hinduism and Mahayana Buddhism until Theravada Buddhism prevailed, even among the lower classes, after its introduction from Sri Lanka in the 13th century. Since then, Hinduism slowly declined in Cambodia, and finally being replaced by Theravadan Buddhist as the major faith in the kingdom. Despite this, Hindu rituals continue to play an important role in the kingdom. Like in neighboring Thailand, the ceremony of coronation is conducted mostly by royal Brahmins, during which the sovereign swears in front of the idols of gods Vishnu and Shiva to maintain the ancient national traditions.

=== Indonesia ===
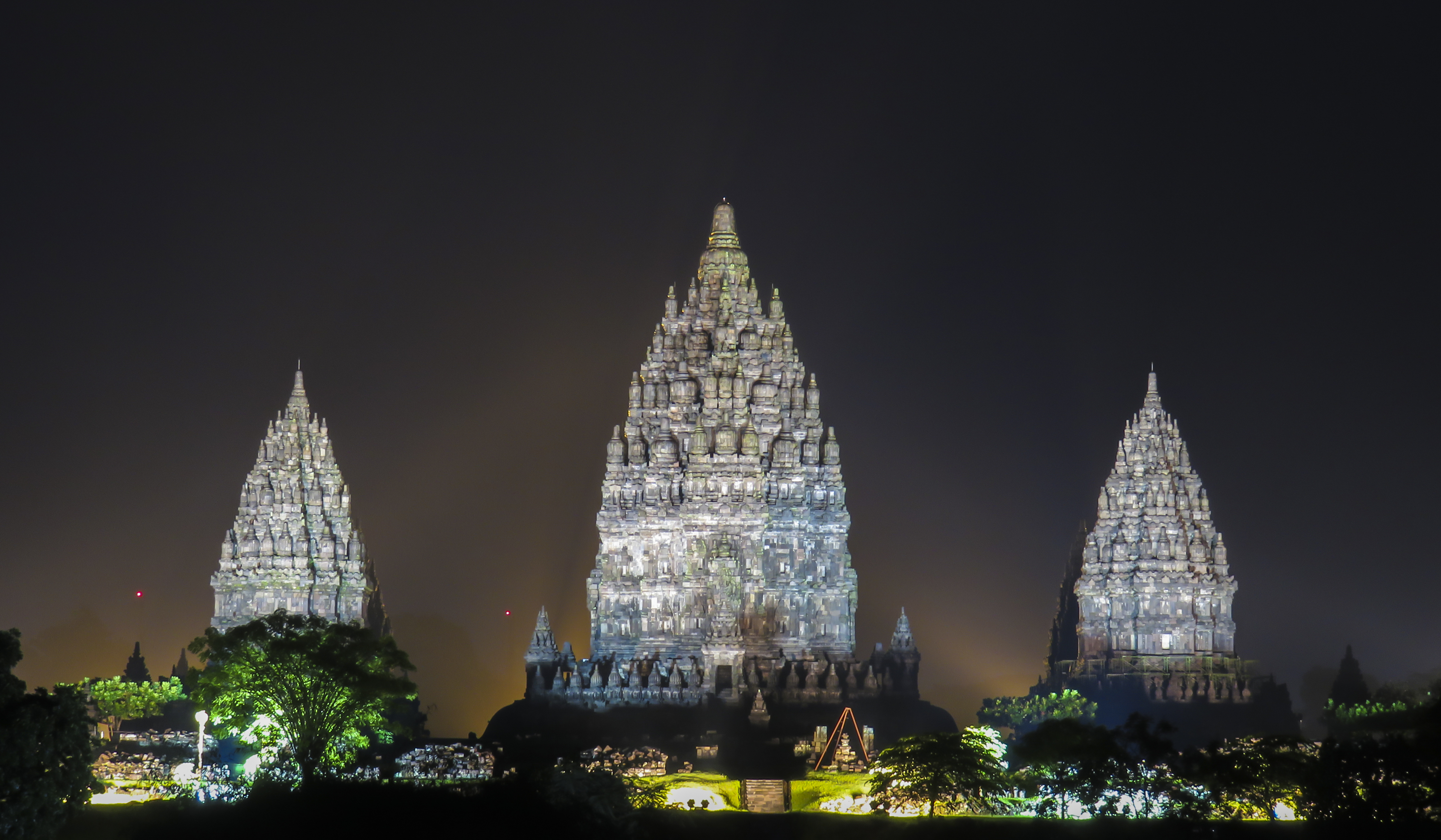
The main three towers of the 9th century Prambanan Trimurti temple complex, the largest Hindu temple site in Indonesia

Today in Indonesia, Hinduism is practised by 1.7% of the total population. Hindus constitute 83.29% of the population of Bali and 5.75% of the population of Central Kalimantan, as of the 2010 census. However, between the 4th century to 15th century, Hinduism and Buddhism was adhered by the majority of the population, along with native indigenous animism and dynamism beliefs that venerated natural and ancestral spirits. By 15th to 16th-century Islam had supplanted Hinduism and Buddhism as the majority religion in the Indonesian archipelago. The influence of Hinduism has profoundly left its marks on the culture of Bali, Java, and Sumatra. Bali has become the last remnant of once Hindu dominated region.

Hindu influences reached the Indonesian Archipelago as early as first century. In 4th-century, the kingdom of Kutai in East Kalimantan, Tarumanagara in West Java, and Holing (Kalingga) in Central Java, were among the early Hindu states established in the region. The notable ancient Indonesian Hindu kingdoms are Mataram kingdom (famous for the construction of the majestic 9th-century Trimurti Prambanan temple) followed by Kediri, Singhasari and the 14th-century Majapahit, the last and largest among Hindu-Buddhist Javanese empires.

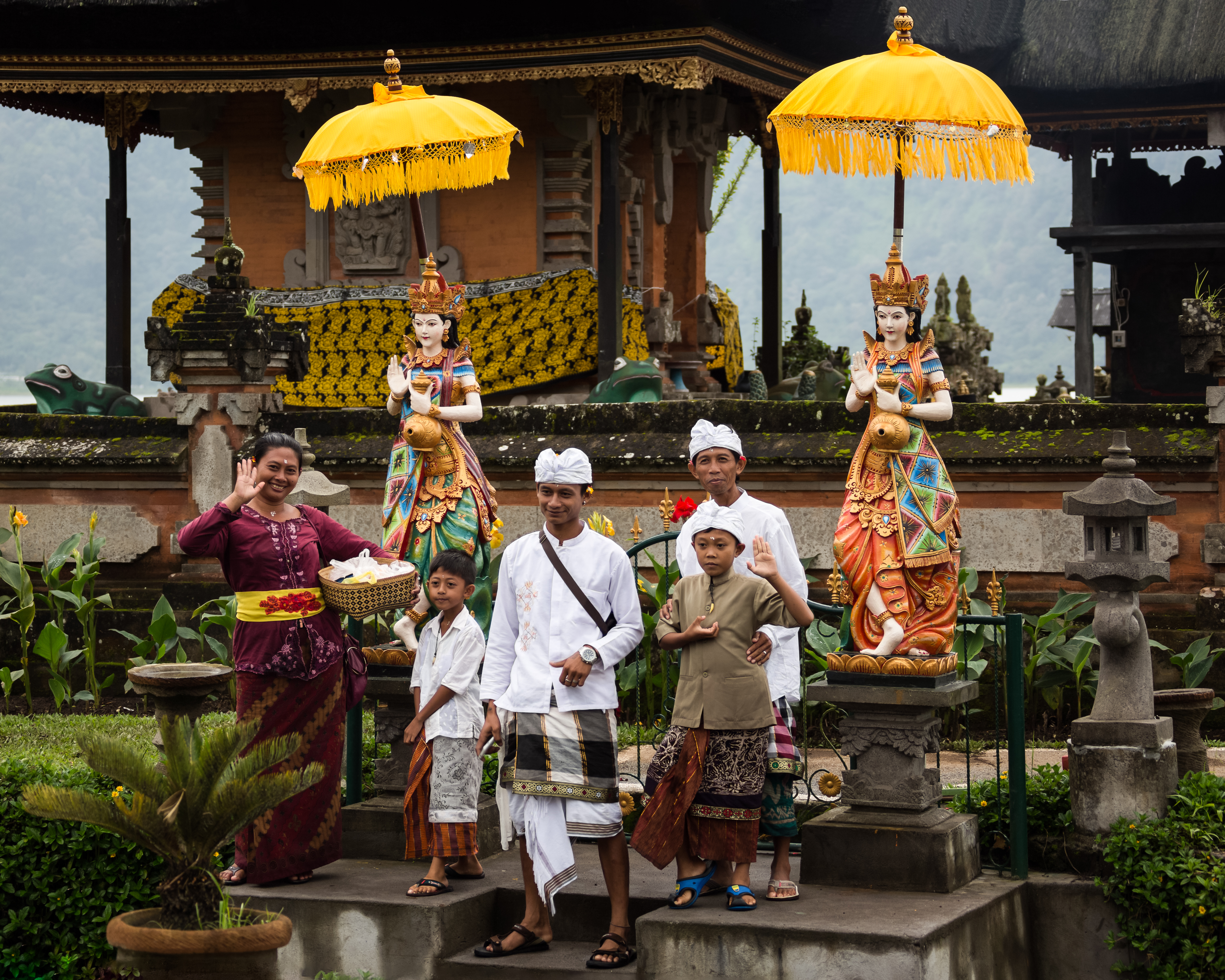
A Hindu Balinese family after puja in Bratan temple

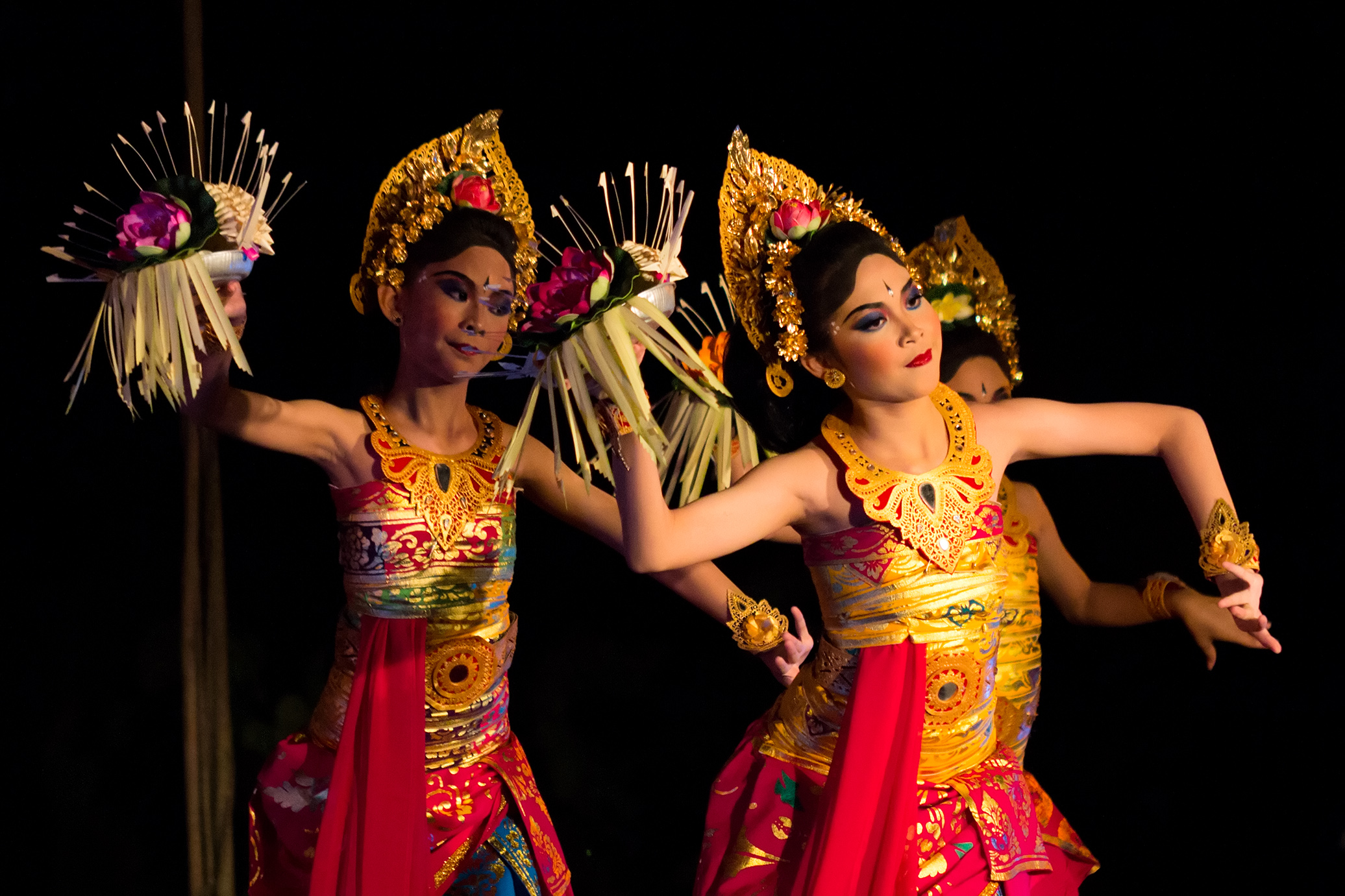
A dance performance by Balinese Hindus. Many of these dances are rituals reflecting mythical or spiritual stories from Hindu epics and other literature.

The Hindu civilisations have left their marks on Indonesian culture. The epics Mahabharata and Ramayana, became enduring traditions among Indonesian art forms, expressed in wayang shadow puppet and dance performances. Many Indonesian names are Sanskrit-based, and Bahasa Indonesia contains loads of loanwords of Sanskrit origin. The vehicle of Vishnu, Garuda, was adopted as both national emblem Garuda Pancasila and flag carrier national airline named Garuda Indonesia.

Today, the Indonesian government has recognised Hinduism as one of the country's six officially sanctioned religions, along with Islam, Protestantism, Roman Catholicism, Buddhism and Confucianism.

The Hindu communities in Java tend to be concentrated around built temples (pura) or around archaeological temple sites (candi) which are being reclaimed as places of Hindu worship. An important Hindu temple in eastern Java is Pura Mandaragiri Sumeru Agung, located on the slope of Mt. Semeru, Java's highest mountain. Another Hindu temple, built on a site with minor archaeological remnants attributed to the Kingdom of Blambangan, the last Hindu polity on Java, and Pura Loka Moksa Jayabaya (in the village of Menang near Kediri), where the Hindu king and prophet Jayabaya is said to have achieved spiritual liberation (moksa). Another site is the new Pura Pucak Raung in East Java, which is mentioned in Balinese literature as the place from where Maharishi Markandeya took Hinduism to Bali in the 14th century.

An example of resurgence around major archaeological remains of ancient Hindu temple sites was observed in Trowulan near Mojokerto, the capital of the legendary Hindu empire Majapahit. A local Hindu movement is struggling to gain control of a newly excavated temple building which they wish to see restored as a site of active Hindu worship. The temple is to be dedicated to Gajah Mada, the man attributed with transforming the small Hindu kingdom of Majapahit into an empire. Although there has been a more pronounced history of resistance to Islamization in East Java, Hindu communities are also expanding in Central Java near the ancient Hindu monuments of Prambanan. On 9 to 12 November 2019, the grand Abhiṣeka sacred ceremony was performed in this temple compound. This Hindu ritual was held for the first time after 1,163 years after the Prambanan temple was founded on 856. The Abhiṣeka ceremony was meant to cleanse, sanctify and purify the temple, thus signify that the temple is not merely an archaeological and tourism site, but also restored to its original function as a focus of Hindu religious activity.

=== Laos ===
Hinduism makes up less than 0.1% of the population of Laos. Approximately 7,000 People of Laos are Hindus.

Ancient Laos used to be a part of Hindu-Buddhist Khmer Empire. The Wat Phou is one of the last influences of that period. The Laotian adaptation of the Ramayana is called Phra Lak Phra Lam.

=== Malaysia ===
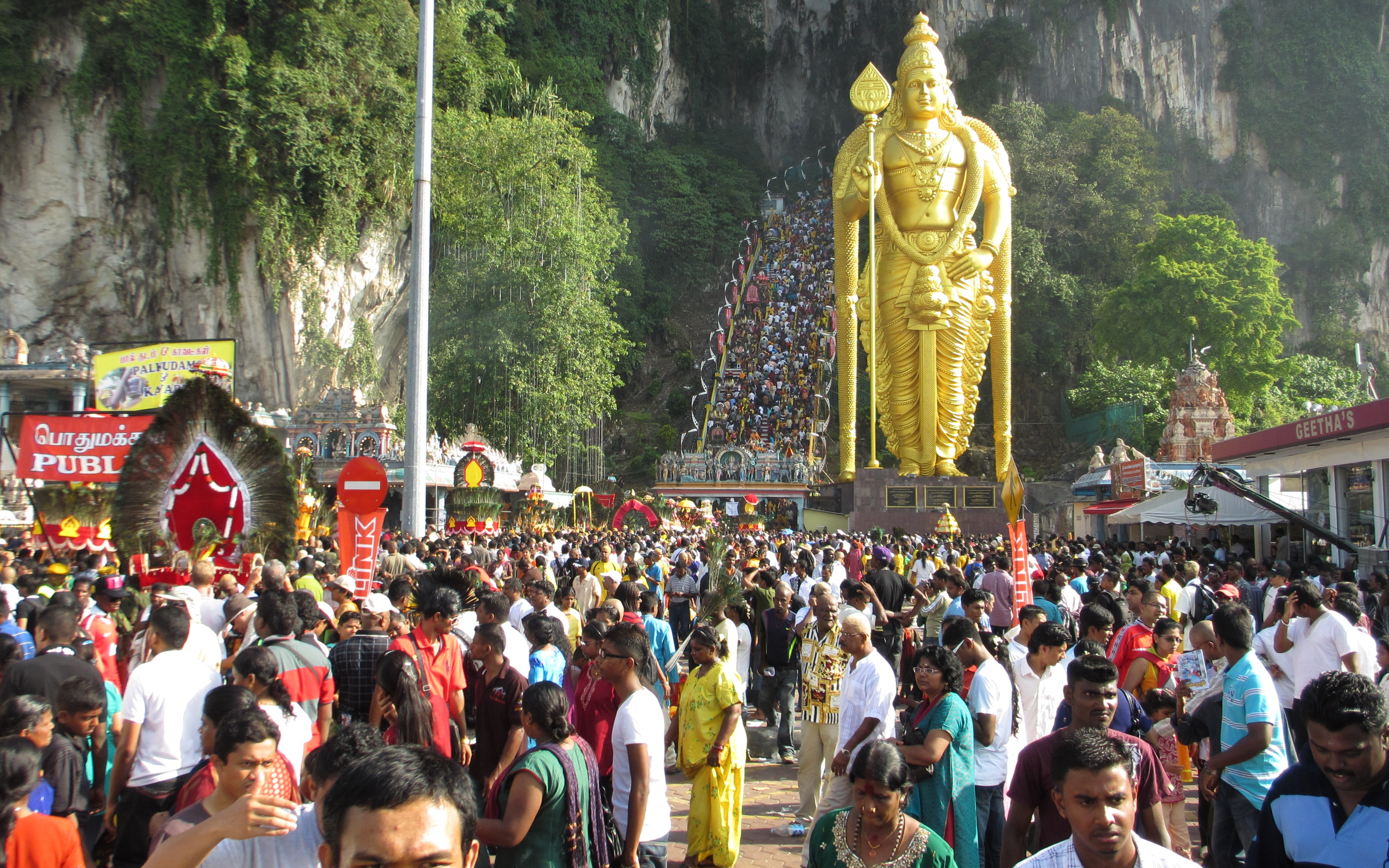
Thaipusam festival at Batu Caves Temple in Malaysia. The majority of Malaysian Hindus are Tamils.

Hinduism is the fourth largest religion in Malaysia. About 1.78 million Malaysian residents (6.3% of the total population) are Hindus, according to 2010 Census of Malaysia.

Most Malaysian Hindus are settled in western parts of Peninsular Malaysia. Indian Hindus and Buddhists began arriving in Malaysia during the ancient and medieval era. A large number of Hindus from South India were brought to Malaysia by British colonial empire during the 19th and 20th century, as indentured labourers to work on coffee and sugarcane plantations and tin mining; later they were deployed in large numbers, along with Chinese Buddhists, on rubber plantations. The British kangani system of recruitment, designed to reduce labour turnover and enhance labour stability, encouraged Hindu workers to recruit friends and family from India to work in British operations in Malaysia. The kangani system brought numerous Tamil Hindus into Malaysia by early 1900s. By 1950s, about 12.8% of Malaysian population professed to be a Hindu.

After Malaysia gained its independence from British colonial empire in 1957, it declared its official state religion as Islam and adopted a discriminatory constitution as well as the Sedition Act of 1971 which limited public debate on Malaysia's treatment of religion, language and citizenship policies. In recent decades, there have been increasing reports of religious persecution of Hindus, along with other minority religions, by various state governments of Malaysia and its Sharia courts. Hindu temples built on private property, and built long before Malaysian independence, have been demolished by Malaysian government officials in recent years. Since the 1970s, there has been large scale emigration of Hindus (along with Buddhists and Christians) from Malaysia.

Malaysian Hindus celebrate Deepavali (festival of lights), Thaipusam (Lord Murugan festival), Pongal (harvest festival) and Navaratri (Durga festival).

=== Myanmar ===
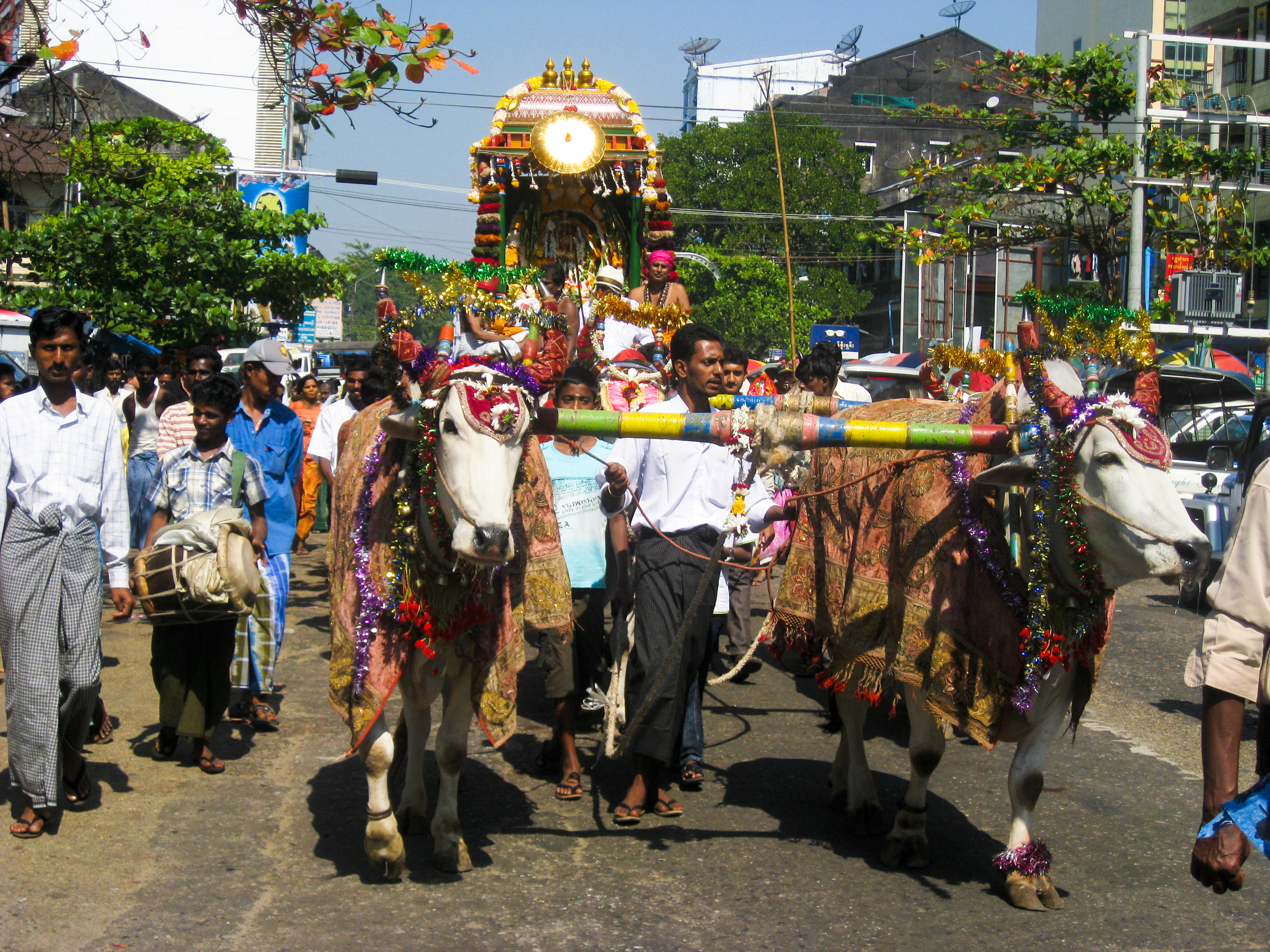
A Hindu procession in Yangon, Myanmar

Hinduism in Burma is practised by about 840,000 people, though a reliable census data is unavailable Most Hindus in Myanmar are Burmese Indians. In modern Myanmar, most Hindus are found in the urban centres of Yangon and Mandalay. Ancient Hindu temples are present in other parts of Burma, such as the 11th century Nathlaung Kyaung Temple dedicated to Vishnu in Bagan. Hinduism in Myanmar has also been influenced by Buddhism with many Hindu temples in Myanmar housing statues of the Buddha.

Aspects of Hinduism continue in Burma today, even in the majority Buddhist culture. For example, Thagyamin is worshipped whose origins are in the Hindu god Indra. Burmese literature has also been enriched by Hinduism, including the Burmese adaptation of the Ramayana, called Yama Zatdaw. Many Hindu gods are likewise worshipped by many Burmese people, such as Saraswati (known as Thuyathadi in Burmese), the goddess of knowledge, who is often worshipped before examinations; Shiva is called Paramizwa; Vishnu is called Withano, and others. Many of these ideas are part of thirty-seven Nat or deities found in Burmese culture.

=== Philippines ===
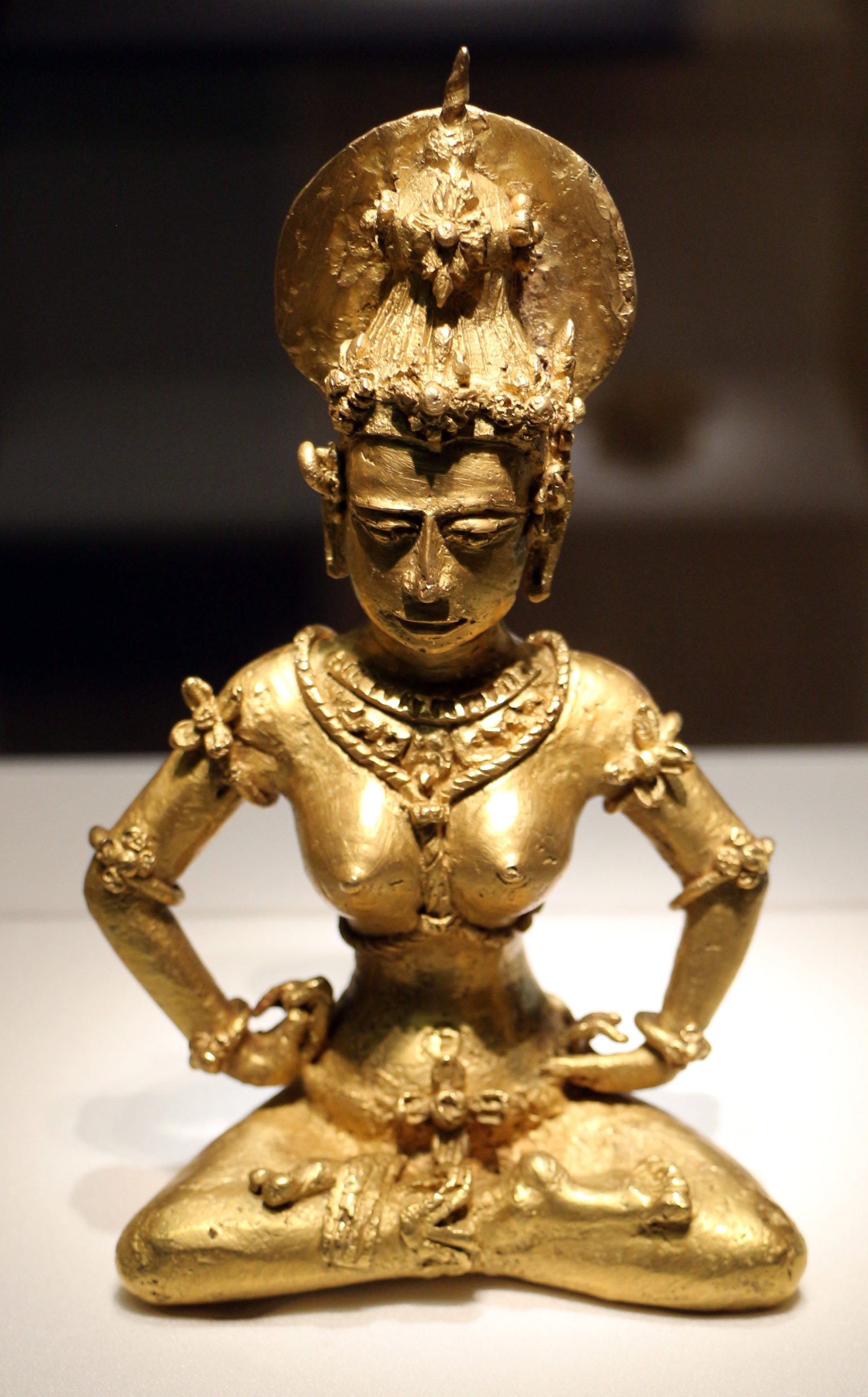
The Agusan image statue (900–950 CE), discovered in 1917 on the banks of the Wawa River near Esperanza, Agusan del Sur, Mindanao in the Philippines

Before the arrival of Islam in Sulu in 1450 and Christianity with Ferdinand Magellan, who sailed from Spain in 1521, the chiefs of many communities across the islands were called Rajas, and the script was derived from Brahmi. The concept of karma is readily understood across various Philippine peoples as part of the traditional worldview, and derived concepts exist such as kalma in Pampangan language, and Gabâ in Visayan languages. The names of precolonial deities, such as Bathala, ultimately come from Hinduism as do many other religious terms and ideas, even as most Filipinos today are Christian. The vocabulary of all Philippine languages reflect different degrees of Hindu influence.

The number of followers of Hinduism today stand at 0.3% of the Philippine population at 34,634

Today, there is a Hindu temple (attended mostly by Sindhīs) on Mahatma Gandhi Street, and the Khalsa Diwan Indian Sikh Temple gurdwāra on United Nations Avenue. Both are in the traditionally Indian enclaves of Paco and Pandacan, two districts of the City of Manila, and are some 15 minutes away from each other by foot. There are currently around 22 gurdwāras nationwide, with most congregants being Indians, Sri Lankans and Nepalese. There are also various Hare Krishna groups in the country that are gaining in popularity, as well as the presence of Ananda Marga and Brahma Kumaris communities, among others.

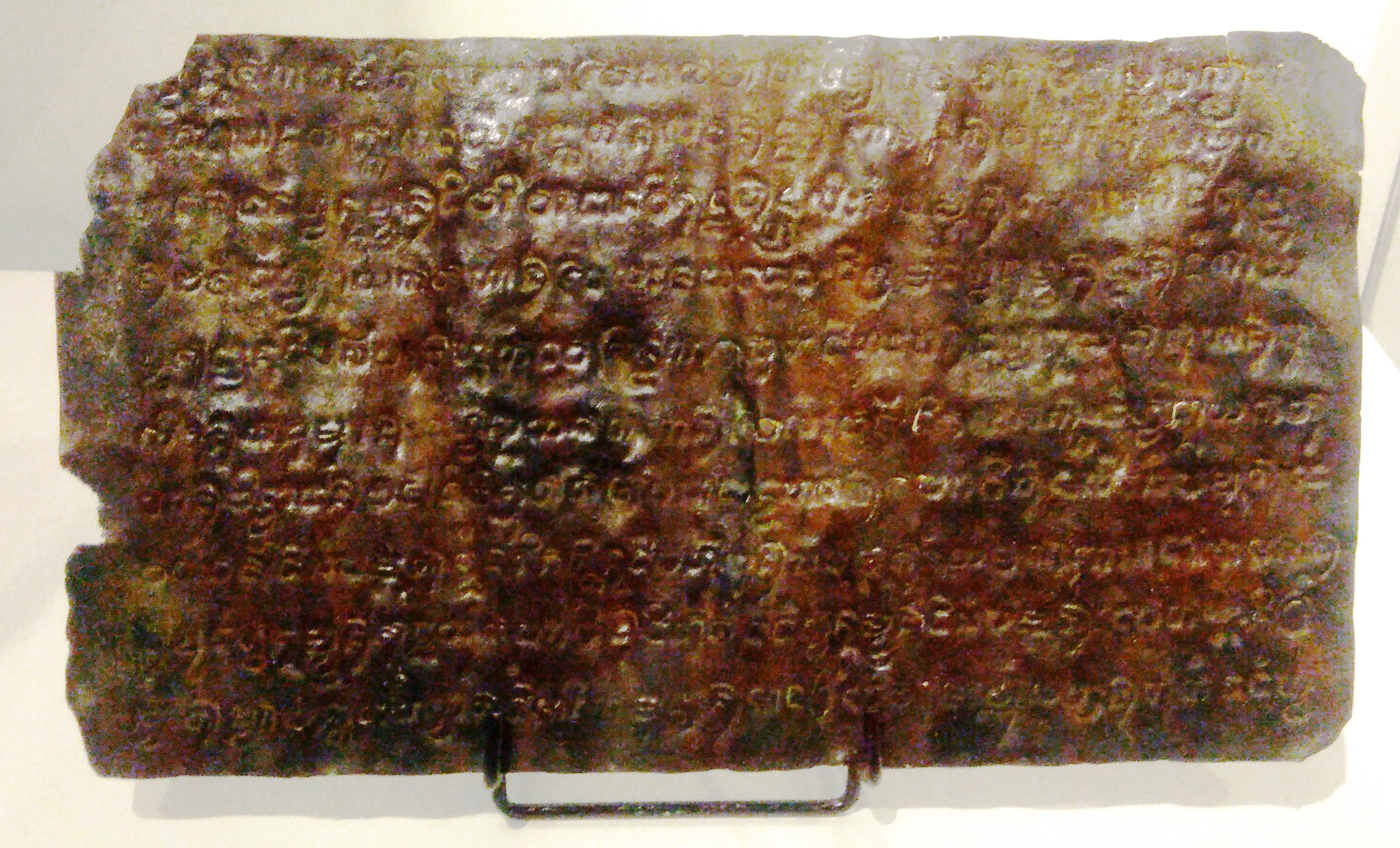
The Laguna Copperplate Inscription (c. 900), the oldest extant document in the Philippines, shows Hindu influences from names to titles. Its inscribed date follows the Shaka era.

=== Singapore ===
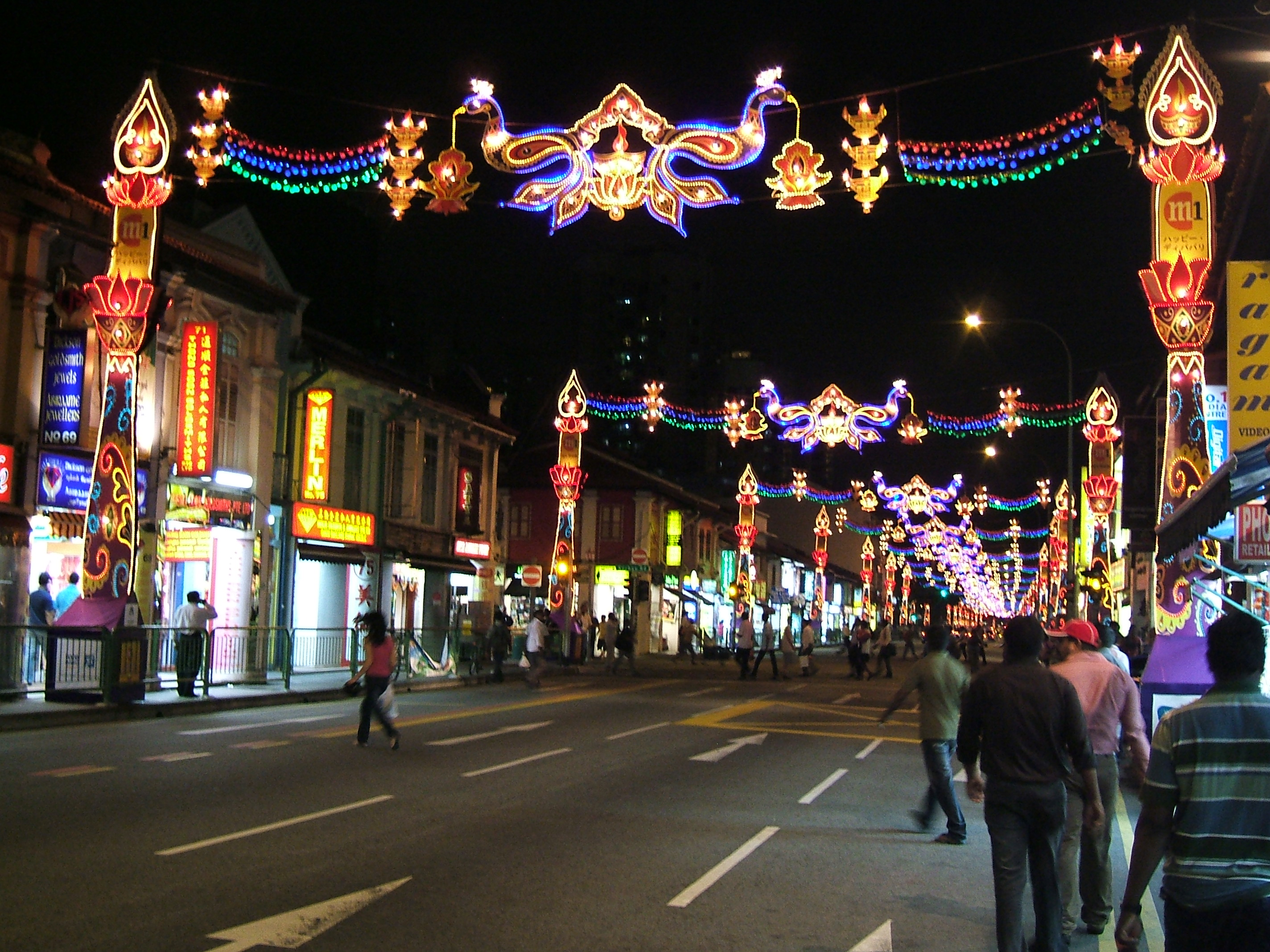
Diwali in Little India, Singapore

The introduction of Hinduism to Singapore dates back to the early 10th century, during the Chola period. Immigrants from Southern India, mostly Tamils, arrived as labourers for the British East India Company, bringing with them their religion and culture. Their arrival saw the building of Dravidian temples throughout the island, and the beginnings of a vibrant Hindu culture. The first temple is Sri Mariamman Temple in Singapore's Chinatown. There are currently about thirty main temples in Singapore, dedicated to various gods and goddesses from the Hindu pantheon. Today, two government bodies deal with Hindu affairs: The Hindu Endowments Board and The Hindu Advisory Board.

Hindus are a minority in Singapore, comprising about 10.1 percent of its citizens and permanent residents in 2010. Among 15 years or older population, there were about 558,000 Hindus; 37% of all Hindus in Singapore speak Tamil at home, another 42% speak English. Deepavali is a major Hindu festival and a public holiday observed in Singapore.

=== Thailand ===
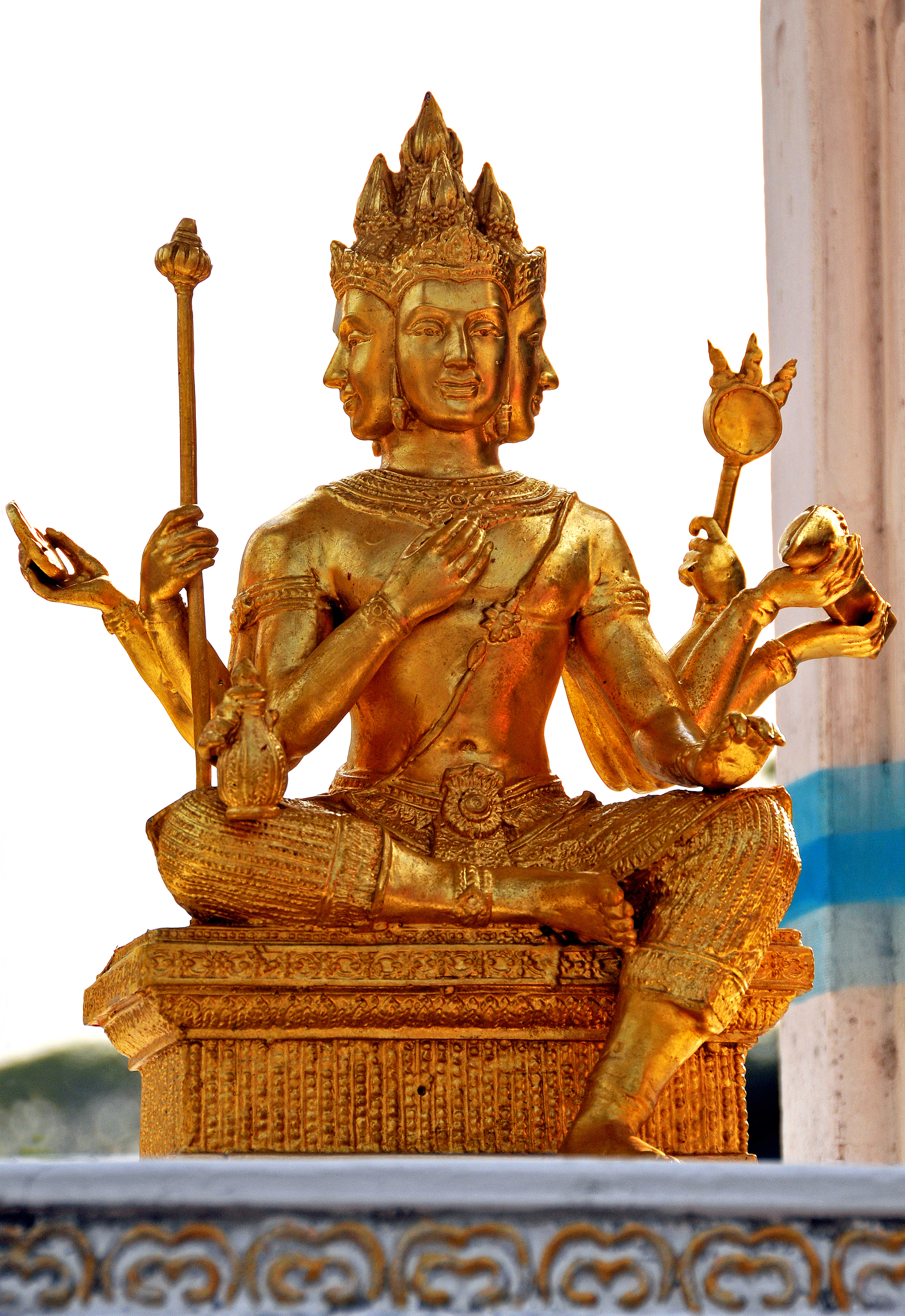
A murti of Brahma in Chiang Mai, Thailand

A number of Hindus remain in Thailand, mostly in cities. In the past, the nation came under the influence of the Khmer Empire, which had strong Hindu roots. Despite the fact that today Thailand is a Buddhist majority nation, many elements of Thai culture and symbolism demonstrates Hindu influences and heritage. For example, the popular epic, Ramakien, is based on the Ramayana. The Emblem of Thailand depicts Garuda, the vahana (vehicle) of Vishnu.

The Thai city, Ayutthaya near Bangkok, is named after Ayodhya, the birthplace of Rama. Numerous rituals derived from Brahmanism are preserved in rituals, such as the use of holy strings and pouring of water from conch shells. Furthermore, Hindu deities are worshipped by many Thais alongside Buddhism, such as Brahma at the famous Erawan Shrine, and statues of Ganesh, Indra, and Shiva, as well as numerous symbols relating to Hindu deities are found, e.g., Garuda, a symbol of the monarchy. Reliefs in temple walls, such as the 12th-century Prasat Sikhoraphum in Surin Province, show a dancing Shiva, with smaller images of Parvati, Vishnu, Brahma and Ganesha.

The Devasathan is a Hindu temple established in 1784 by King Rama I. The temple is the centre of Brahminism in Thailand. The royal court Brahmins operate the temple, they perform several royal ceremonies per year.

An annual Giant Swing ceremony known as Triyampavai-Tripavai was held in major cities of Thailand until 1935, when it was abolished for safety reasons. The name of the ceremony was derived from the names of two Tamil language Hindu chants: Thiruvempavai and Thiruppavai. It is known that Tamil verses from Thiruvempavai — poet pratu sivalai ("opening the portals of Shiva's home") — were recited at this ceremony, as well as the coronation ceremony of the Thai king. According to T.P. Meenakshisundaram, the name of the festival indicates that Thiruppavai might have been recited as well. The swinging ceremony depicted a legend about how the god created the world. Outside shops, particularly in towns and rural areas, statues of Nang Kwak as the deity of wealth, fortune and prosperity (version of Lakshmi) are found.

The elite, and the royal household, often employ Brahmins to mark funerals and state ceremonies such as the Royal Ploughing Ceremony to ensure a good harvest. The importance of Hinduism cannot be denied, even though much of the rituals has been combined with Buddhism.

According to the Thai Census of 2005, there are 52,631 Hindus living in Thailand, making up just 0.09% of the total population.

=== Vietnam ===
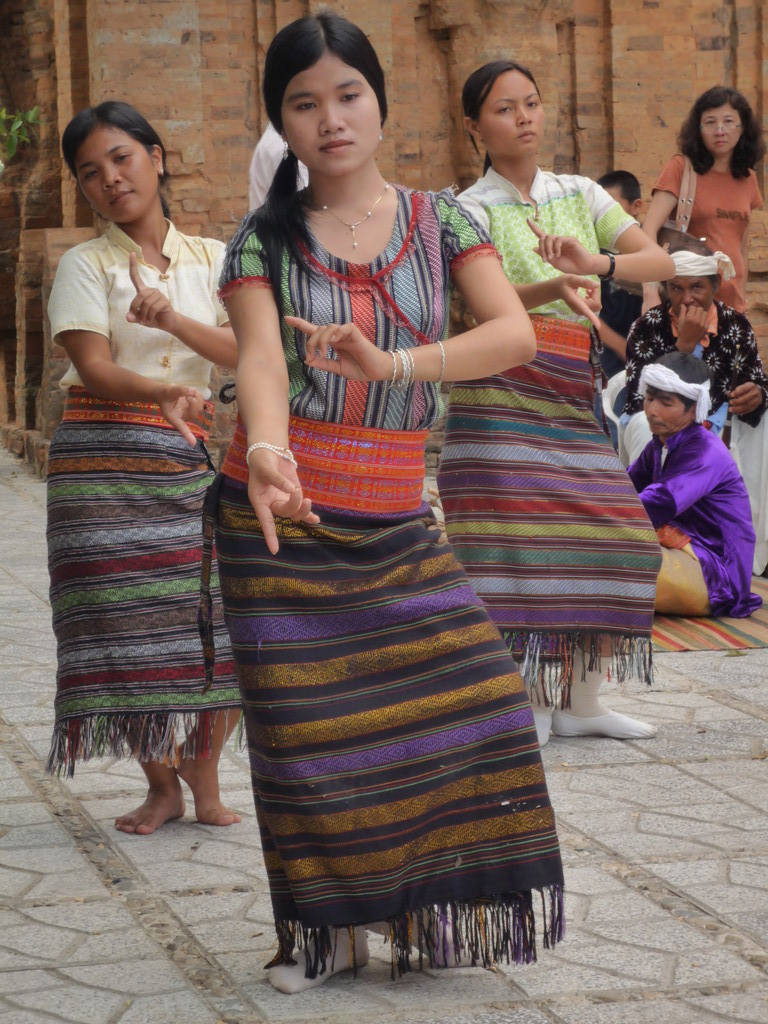
Balamon Cham dancers in Po Nagar

The first recorded religion of the Champa was a form of Shaiva Hinduism, brought by sea from India. Hinduism was an important religion among the Cham people (along with Buddhism, Islam, and indigenous beliefs) until the sixteenth century. Numerous temples dedicated to Shiva were constructed in the central part of what is now Vietnam. The mainly Hindu Óc Eo archeological site in Mekong River Delta in southern Vietnam, dates back to the 7th century and earlier. The Champa civilisation was located in the more southern part of what is today Central Vietnam, and was a highly Indianized Hindu Kingdom, practising a form of Shaivite Hinduism brought by sea from India. Mỹ Sơn, a Hindu temple complex in central Vietnam built by the Cham people is still standing albeit in ruins in Quảng Nam Province, in Vietnam. Since the 15th century under the growing Vietnamese kingdom from the north, Champa was conquered and reduced as a polity. The Chams were subsequently absorbed by the Vietnamese and today are recognised as one of the many ethnic minorities of Vietnam.

The Chams Balamon (Hindu Brahmin Chams) form a minority of the Cham population in Vietnam while most of the Chams are known to follow Islam and are known as Cham Bani. The term Balamon is considered to have been derived from Brahmin, however, another study suggests that 70% are considered to descend from the Nagavamshi Kshatriya caste (pronounced in Cham(?) as "Satrias"), and claim to be the descendants of the Champa Empire. In any case a sizeable proportion of the Balamon Hindu Cham are considered Brahmins.

Hindu temples are called Bimong in the Cham language and the priests are called Halau Tamunay Ahier.

The exact number of Hindus in Vietnam are not published in Government census, but there are estimated to be at least 10,000 Balamon Hindus, with another 4,000 Hindus living in Ho Chi Minh City; most of whom are of Indian (Tamil) or of mixed Indian-Vietnamese descent. The Mariamman Temple is one of the most notable Tamil Hindu temples in Ho Chi Minh City. Ninh Thuan and Binh Thuan Provinces are where most of the Cham ethnic group (≈65%) in Vietnam reside according to the last population census. Cham Balamon (Hindu Cham) in Ninh Thuan numbered 7,000 in 2002 inhabiting 6 of 34 Cham villages. If this population composition is typical for the Balamon Cham population of Vietnam as a whole then approximately 10% of Balamon Chams in Vietnam are Hindu.

Hinduism is practised by the Balamon Cham people of Vietnam, particularly in the Ninh Thuan province (10.4%) and Binh Thuan (4.8%).

== See also ==
- Indian religions in Southeast Asia
  - Buddhism in Southeast Asia
  - Jainism in Southeast Asia
  - Indianised kingdom
  - Balinese Hinduism
- Spread of Indian influence
  - Greater India
  - Indian diaspora
  - Buddhism in Southeast Asia
  - History of Indian influence on Southeast Asia
  - Indianization of Southeast Asia
- Trading routes
  - Indus–Mesopotamia relations
  - Indian maritime history
  - Indian Ocean trade
  - Silk Road
  - Ancient maritime history
