= List of biosphere reserves in Vietnam =

Location of UNESCO biosphere reserves within Vietnam

There are 11 biosphere reserves in Vietnam recognized by UNESCO, include:

- Cần Giờ Mangrove Forest, 2000
- Đồng Nai Biosphere Reserve (former Cat Tien, 2001 - extended in 2011)
- Cát Bà Biosphere Reserve, 2004
- Red River Delta Biosphere Reserve, 2004
- Kiên Giang Biosphere Reserve, 2006
- Western Nghệ An, 2007
- Mũi Cà Mau National Park, 2009
- Cu Lao Cham Marine Park, 2009
- Langbiang Biosphere Reserve, 2015
- Núi Chúa National Park, 2021
- Kon Hà Nừng Biosphere Reserve, 2021

== See also ==
- List of World Heritage Sites in Vietnam
- World Network of Biosphere Reserves
