= Internet in Vietnam =

The Internet in Vietnam is growing rapidly and plays a significant role in the country's broader digital transformation strategy. With high smartphone penetration and mobile-first internet usage, Vietnam is adopting digital technologies for daily activities as well as to support government reform, economic modernisation, and social development. Internet use has become a daily activity for many Vietnamese people, serving purposes such as work, study, and entertainment.

Between 2001 and 2005, the number of Internet users increased from 800,000 to 3 million. By 2007, Vietnam reported Internet penetration levels of 11.5%, rising to 22.4 percent in 2008 and 45.2% in 2010. By 2013, Vietnam officials reported Internet penetration levels of 75.2%, which is about 68 million users with Wifi signals that can be found anywhere in every commercial and residential area. As of January 2021, out of its population of over 96 million people, the number of internet users reached approximately 69 million.

== History ==
=== VARENet ===
The mid-1990s witnessed gradual infrastructure development through predominantly international assistance. Around 1992, Rob Hurle, a retired professor of Information Technology at the Australian National University, took what is considered a founding step in connecting Vietnam to the internet with the initial hope of connecting his former students to the ANU mainframes. Partnering with Tran Ba Thai of the Institute of Information Technology (IOIT) in Hanoi, Dr. Hurle has been able to connect Vietnam and Australia via UUCP. Following the success of Dr. Hurle's venture. ANU as an institution collaborated with Telstra and, using Australia's DEET grant funding, would develop VARENet, the "Vietnam Academic Research and Educational Network" — an internal network which would by 1996 cover areas of the country including Hanoi, Haiphong, Huế, Nha Trang, and Ho Chi Minh City.

=== NetNam ===
That same year, IOIT and Dr. Hurle collaborated with Canada's International Development Research Center to developed a different network called NetNam which was focused on providing connectivity to NGOs and a growing Vietnamese client base. Dr. Hurle and Tran were particularly instrumental in the development of NetNam, setting up the technological base of the network and securing the .vn domain code within the IANA DNS registry. At the time, the .vn domain code has been fully located within ANU's jurisdiction. By 1996, NetNam has had had hundreds of users consisting of academic institutions as well as NGOs.

=== Nationalization ===
The watershed moment for Vietnam's internet history came on November 19, 1997, when Vietnam officially launched internet service after the government established a National Internet Coordinating Committee and made Vietnam Data Communication Company (VDC), a state-owned subsidiary of Vietnam Post and Telecommunication Group (VNPT), the first licensed Internet Access Provider. After the establishment of VDC, ANU eventually transferred its ownership of the .vn domain name to VNPT. By the decade's end, internet users exceeded 100,000, representing a milestone in the development of the internet within the country.

== Infrastructure ==
=== Submarine Cable Connectivity ===
Vietnam's international internet connectivity has historically relied on a small number of submarine fiber optic cables, creating significant bottlenecks during physical disruptions. As of 2023, the country utilized five primary international lines: AAE-1, APG, IA, AAG, and SMW-3. The network demonstrated limited redundancy, with the SMW-3 cable remaining operational despite approaching its planned 25-year lifespan and retirement date in late 2024. A major expansion of this infrastructure materialized in April 2025 with the commercial launch of the Asia Direct Cable (ADC) system. The Viettel Military Industry and Telecoms Group (Viettel) served as the sole Vietnamese investor in the consortium. The 9,800 km cable links Vietnam to China, Hong Kong, Thailand, the Philippines, Singapore, and Japan, establishing direct connections to Asia’s three primary data hubs. The ADC offers a design capacity of 50 Tbps, which exceeded the combined international bandwidth of Vietnam's five existing cables by approximately 125% at the time of its launch. By reducing reliance on foreign-owned transit hubs and increasing direct capacity, Vietnam aims to secure the physical foundation necessary for a sovereign digital economy and future AI development, mitigating the risks of global network fragmentation.

In 2016, an Asia Pacific Gateway cable was deployed. A table showcasing the development of the internet's capacity from 2000 to 2018 is displayed below:

Year	Users	Percentage (%)	Subscribers	Capacity (Bit/s)	Domestic Bandwidth (Bit/s)
2000	800.000				
2003	3.000.000	3.80		1,036	
2006	9.000.000	17.67		7,000	
2009	30.000.007	24.47		53,659	68,760
2010	36,784,035				-
2012	50,100,000				
2018	68,541,344	70.4%			

=== Infrastructure as Digital Sovereignty ===
Vietnam's primary concern is digital sovereignty rooted in physical infrastructure. Vietnam’s cybersecurity strategy is a "whole-of-government" endeavor driven by the triple imperatives of regime survival, national sovereignty, and socio-economic development, necessitating massive state investment in physical infrastructure (fiber optics) and legal frameworks (Decree 53). In general, Southeast Asian nations are executing a "structural recalibration" of the internet architecture to reclaim digital sovereignty from Western hyperscalers who currently control 68% of global data centers.

== E-commerce ==
Vietnam has a rapidly growing e-commerce sector with steadily increasing market value. During the COVID-19 pandemic, Vietnamese consumers turned to online shopping more than ever before, accelerating sector's growth. Before the pandemic, travel, mobility, and accommodation were the e-commerce category with the highest consumer spending. Since the first outbreak of COVID-19 in Vietnam, consumers have been more willing to shop for basic necessities and fresh products online, making food and personal care the e-commerce category with the highest growth in 2020. These new shopping habits are expected to remain even after the pandemic. Vietnam's e-commerce market has rapidly grown since 2020, with the average annual growth rate moving from 16% in 2020 to 30% from 2021-2025. In 2021 the market valued at $13.7 billion and is expected to grow to $32 billion in 2025. There are several factors that contribute to this rapid growth, one of which is the National ecommerce development master plan (2020) that supports cashless payments and the digital economy. Another factor is the growth in the middle income class, reaching 13 million and resulting in an increase in domestic consumption through digital and electronic commerce. Additionally the internet economy boom has contributed to Vietnam's ecommerce market with a projected $43 billion growth by 2025, as well as high internet and smartphone penetration. Online stores such as Tiktok shop, Shopee, tiki, lazada, and Sendo have also contributed to online purchase growth. Typical purchases include clothes, electronics, household appliances, and personal care products. These Vietnamese businesses are also increasingly leveraging international platforms to expand their reach. For instance, Shopee International Platform hosts nearly 400,000 Vietnamese sellers, collectively providing over 15 million products to markets such as Malaysia, Singapore, the Philippines, Thailand, and Taiwan. These sellers have achieved monthly sales growth rates of 20-30%.

== Social Media Usage ==
Social media use has assumed a dominant role in Vietnamese dramatically, with around 90% penetration being achieved by YouTube, Facebook, and Zalo. Generation Z primarily use Facebook, with 97.1% penetration, while Zalo and YouTube have achieved 80.9% and 75.7% respectively. High levels of social media usage amongst Gen Z has increasingly worried critics as social media platforms have played an increasingly important part of daily life. Social media has played a significant role in Vietnam's politics under a government that commonly represses speech. Social media, and the anonymity it grants, is commonly used to express discontent and political sentiments that may not otherwise be acceptable in popular discourse. Social media has thus contributed to a decline of traditional media in Vietnam. In December 2024, the Vietnamese government passed Decree 147, a law that granted the government more power to regulate social media content. The decree forces foreign social media organizations to require all users to verify their identity during registration, and provide it to government authorities when requested. Critics claim that this measure allows the government to more easily prosecute those who express discontent with the Vietnamese government and regulate social media platforms more broadly.

== Internet Freedoms in Vietnam ==
The Vietnamese government enforces strict controls over the internet. In November 2024, the National Assembly of Vietnam passed a data protection law which limited cross-border data transfers and imposed stringent data processing rules. This law led a number of international tech firms to express concern about internet freedom in the country. In Vietnam, authorities aggressively pressure global internet companies to comply with content moderation requests. Government officials have forced social media platforms to remove posts promoting political dissent. They have also imposed prison sentences on both activists and everyday users for their online activities. In November 2022, the blogger Bùi Văn Thuận was sentenced to eight years in prison for engaging in antistate speech under Article 117 of the penal code. A few months earlier, in July 2022, six members of the Tinh That Bong Lai temple—everyday people, not online influencers—were sentenced between three and five years in prison for the YouTube videos they posted. The government claimed that their videos had defamed the dignity of both Buddhist leaders and local police.

Vietnam's cybersecurity law enacted in 2019 requires that technology companies hand over information to authorities upon request and store user data domestically. Two years prior, in 2017, the government deployed Force 47, a cyber unit made up of 10,000 members, to counter perceived anti-state narratives. Because authorities weaponize legal measures to control online discourse, Vietnam consistently ranks among the most repressive countries for internet freedom in the world. Reporters Without Borders, in their 2024 World Press Freedom Index, ranked Vietnam 174th out of 180 territories and countries.

== Digital Transformation ==
=== Digital Growth ===
In recent years, Vietnam has begun a digital transformation agenda focusing on three main areas of digitalization: government, economy, and society. By implementing digital technologies to everyday uses, Vietnam aims to enhance government services, increase efficiency and transparency, and drive innovation void of past limitations. Within this, Vietnam looks to position itself as a high income, tech driven economy by 2045. The digital economy has seen remarkable growth, reaching milestones such as a 16% growth from 2019 projecting a value of $52 billion by 2025. Further digitalization goals are well within reach based on current and projected growth rates. To support this rapid digitalization, enhancing the infrastructure in Vietnam is crucial. The development of a nationwide 5G network and other projects such as expansion of fiber optic cables looks to assist in emerging technologies and assist digitalization. Furthermore, the government is fostering a digital society by promoting digital citizenship, digital life, and digital commerce. Efforts include integrating digital skills into education and encouraging the adoption of digital platforms across various sectors. However, challenges remain, particularly in bridging the digital divide between urban and rural areas and ensuring cybersecurity in an increasingly connected environment. Addressing these issues is crucial for Vietnam to fully realize its digital transformation goals. Platforms like Shopee and Zalo are emblematic of how Vietnam's digital economy and digital society intersect, demonstrating how domestic innovation and global integration are fueling transformation. If Vietnam can overcome infrastructure gaps and safeguard digital rights, it stands poised to emerge as a regional digital leader by mid-century.

=== Cybersecurity ===
Vietnam’s strategy to accelerate 5G coverage, targeting 99% population access by 2030, has introduced new cybersecurity challenges related to supply chain reliance. In 2025, despite previous hesitation regarding Chinese technology, Vietnamese telecommunications providers signed procurement contracts with Huawei and ZTE. Notably, in June 2025, the military-owned operator Viettel signed a technology transfer agreement with Huawei, while other consortiums awarded contracts to ZTE for antenna systems. Huawei claims that their base stations consume 30% less energy than their competitors, allowing Vietnam to meet its aggressive digital development goals within budget constraints.

By selecting Huawei and ZTE, the state is prioritizing the 30% cost advantage to modernize the economy rapidly. However, concerns are that this reliance on foreign infrastructure may expose Vietnam to digital risks. These concerns are contextualized by historical incidents, such as the July 2016 cyberattacks on Noi Bai and Tan Son Nhat airports. In that event, the "1937CN" hacker group compromised flight information screens to display the "nine-dash line" and broadcast politically motivated messages regarding the South China Sea, also known in Vietnam as the East Sea (Vietnamese: Biển Đông), disputes.
