= Viennese =

Viennese may refer to:

- Vienna, the capital of Austria
- Viennese people, List of people from Vienna
- Viennese German, the German dialect spoken in Vienna
- Viennese classicism
- Viennese coffee house, an eating establishment and part of Viennese culture
- Viennese cuisine
- Viennese oboe, a musical instrument
- Viennese Waltz, a genre of ballroom dance

== See also ==
- Vietnamese (disambiguation)
