= Cù Lao Ré volcanic islands =

Cù Lao Ré group
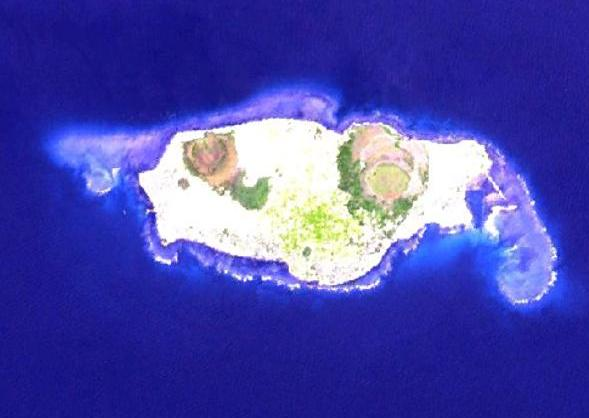
- Satellite photo of Cù Lao Ré by NASA

Highest point
- Elevation: 181 m (594 ft)
- Coordinates: 15.38°N 109.12°E

Geography
- Location: Northeast of Quảng Ngãi province, Vietnam

Geology
- Rock age: Holocene
- Mountain type: Volcanic field
- Last eruption: Unknown

Cù-Lao Ré is a volcanic field northeast of Quảng Ngãi province, Vietnam. The field consists of 13 volcanic cones, four of which are subaerial and nine submarine. Three of the subaerial cones formed the Cù-Lao Ré island, while the fourth one formed the Cù-Lao Bai island. The islands form the Lý Sơn district of Quảng Ngãi province.

== See also ==
- List of volcanoes in Vietnam
