= Vietnamese =

Vietnamese may refer to:

- Something of, from, or related to Vietnam, a country in Southeast Asia
- People of Vietnamese descent, the majority ethnicity being the Viet (Kinh)
  - For people living in Vietnam, see Demographics of Vietnam
  - For those living overseas, see Vietnamese diaspora
- Vietnamese language
- Vietnamese alphabet
- Vietnamese cuisine
- Vietnamese culture
- Vietnamese architecture

== See also ==
- Viennese (disambiguation)
