= International rankings of Vietnam =

The following are international rankings of Vietnam.

== Cities ==
- Hanoi, ECA International: Most expensive cities 2015, ranked 198 of 250 and 59 out of 63 in Asia Pacific region.
- Ho Chi Minh City, ECA International: Most expensive cities 2015, ranked 201
- Ho Chi Minh City, Urban area population 2015 projection, ranked 39
- Hanoi, Urban area population 2015 projection, ranked 109

== Demographics ==
- 2022 Population ranked 15 out of 195
- Population Density ranked 49 out of 248
- Total immigrant population as of 2006 ranked 156 out of 192 countries

== Economy ==
- IMD International: World Competitiveness Scoreboard 2009, not ranked among top 57 economies
- The Heritage Foundation/The Wall Street Journal: 2012 Index of Economic Freedom ranked 136 out of 179
- World Economic Forum: Global Competitiveness Report 2012-2013, ranked 75 out of 144 countries
- World Economic Forum Global Competitiveness Report 2011, ranked 65 out of 142

== Education ==
- 2018 Programme for International Student Assessment - Mathematics ranked 24 out of 79
- 2018 Programme for International Student Assessment - Science ranked 4 out of 79
- 2018 Programme for International Student Assessment - Reading ranked 13 out of 78
- Literacy rate ranked 93 out of 195

== Environment ==
- Yale University Center for Environmental Law and Policy and Columbia University Center for International Earth Science Information Network: 2008 Environmental Performance Index, ranked 76 out of 149 countries

== Geography ==
- Total area ranked 65 out of 233 countries

== Globalization ==
- KOF: Index of Globalization 2011, 125 out of 208
- A.T. Kearney/Foreign Policy Magazine: Globalization Index 2006, not ranked

== Health ==
- Body mass index ranked 183 out of 196
- Healthcare ranked 62 out of 91
- Life expectancy ranked 77 out of 194
- Obesity ranked 191 out of 191 (world least fattest countries)
- Suicide rate ranked 114 out of 183

== Industry ==
- OICA automobile production 2007, ranked 46 out of 51 countries

== Military ==
- Institute for Economics and Peace 2011 Global Peace Index ranked 30 out of 153

== Political ==
- Transparency International: Corruption Perceptions Index 2011, ranked 112 out of 183 countries
- Reporters Without Borders: Worldwide Press Freedom Index 2011-2012, ranked 172 out of 179 countries
- The Economist Democracy Index 2007, ranked 149 out of 167 countries

== Safety ==
- Global Peace Index ranked 44 out of 163
- Global Terrorism Index ranked 85 out of 163

== Society ==
- United Nations Development Programme Human Development Index 2021, ranked 115 out of 191
- The Economist: Quality-of-Life Index 2005, ranked 61 out of 111 countries
- University of Leicester Satisfaction with Life Index 2006, ranked 95 out of 178 countries
- World Giving Index: 2011, ranked 125 out of 153 countries
- World Happiness Report 2023, ranked 65 out of 137 countries

== Technology ==
- Number of mobile phones in use ranked 13
- Number of broadband Internet users ranked 33
- Economist Intelligence Unit: E-readiness 2008, ranked 65 out of 70 countries
- World Economic Forum Networked Readiness Index 2008-2009, ranked 70 out of 134 countries
- United Nations: e-Government Readiness Index, 2008, not ranked among top 50 countries
- World Intellectual Property Organization: Global Innovation Index 2026, ranked 43 out of 139 countries

== Tourism ==
- World Tourism Organization: World Tourism rankings 2007, ranked 46

== Transportation ==
- Total rapid transit systems not ranked among top 53

== See also ==
- Lists of countries
- Lists by country
- List of international rankings
