= Ile des Cendres =

- Summit depth: 20 m (66 ft)

Location
- Coordinates: 10.158°N 109.014°E
- Country: Vietnam

Geology
- Type: Submarine volcanoes
- Age of rock: Historical
- Last eruption: March to May 1923

Ile des Cendres (Vietnamese: Hòn Tro, also known as Veteran) is a group of submarine volcanoes located off the southeast coast of Vietnam, 100 kilometres (62 mi) southeast of Phan Thiết. Volcanoes in this group are characterized by a width of between 1–1.2 kilometres (0.62–0.75 mi) and a height between 60–70 metres (200–230 ft).

The volcanism relates to a still ongoing regimen of crustal extension. Argon-argon dating has yielded ages of 800,000 years to 0 on olivine tholeiite; the last known eruption was recorded in 1923 which formed land that was later removed by the sea. A past eruption in 608 AD might be recorded in the chronicles of the Sui dynasty, while future eruptions could cause tsunamis.

Ile des Cendres is one of Vietnam's two Holocene volcanoes, i.e. those that have been active in the Holocene Epoch (approximately 11,700 years ago to the present day).

== See also ==
- List of volcanoes in Vietnam
