= Red River Delta Biosphere Reserve =

Protected area in Vietnam

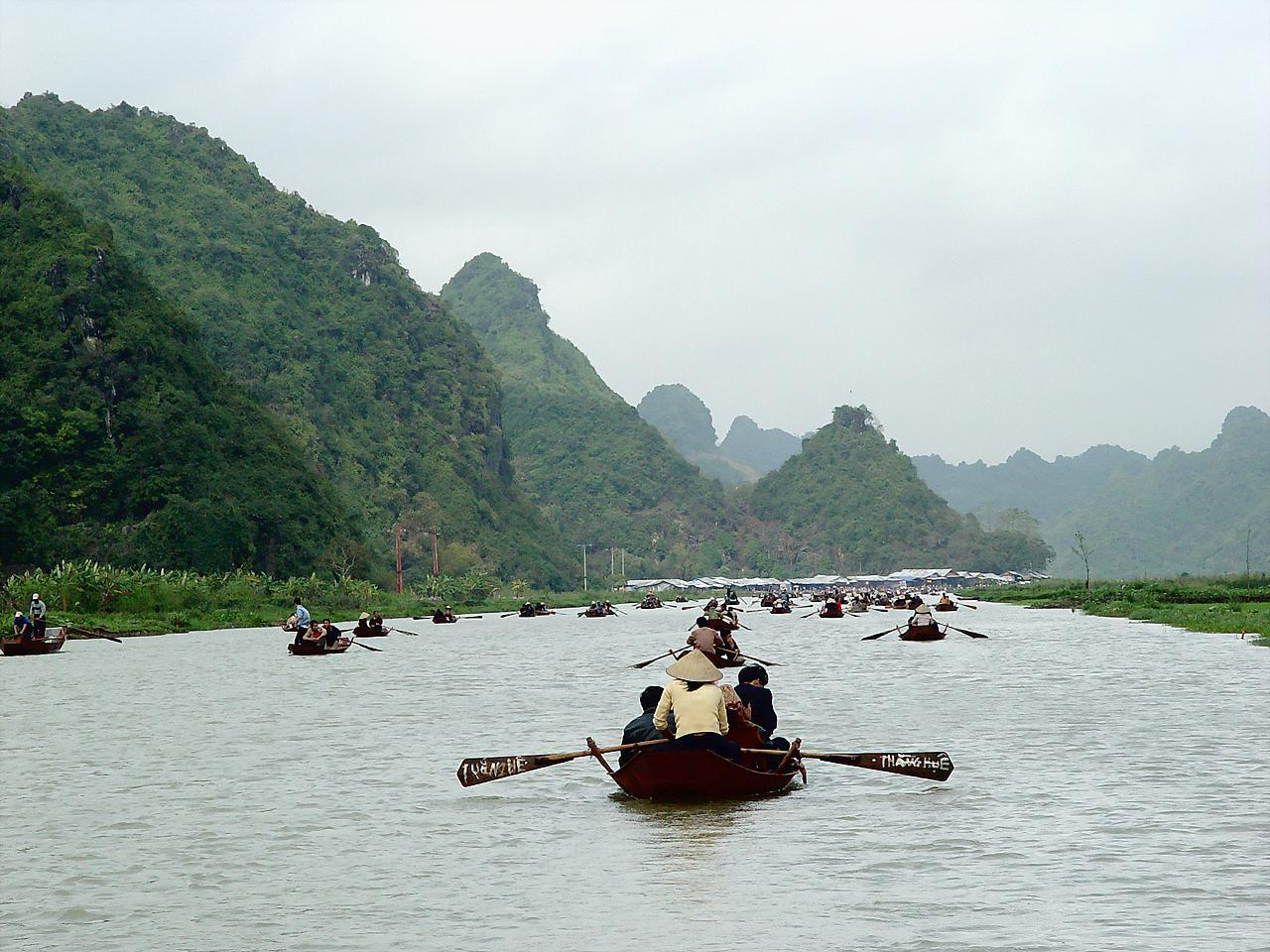
- Red River Delta

- Location within Vietnam
- Location: Red River Delta, Vietnam
- Coordinates: 20°28′12″N 107°0′0″E
- Area: 137,261 hectares (529.97 sq mi)
- Established: 2004

The Red River Delta Biosphere Reserve (established 2004) is a UNESCO biosphere reserve in the coastal region of northern Vietnam. Mangroves and intertidal habitats of the Red River Delta form wetlands of high biodiversity especially in the Xuan Thuy and Tien Hai districts. These wetlands are of global importance as migratory sites for several bird species.

The reserve's surface area (terrestrial and marine) is 137,261 hectares (529.97 sq mi). The core area is 14,842 hectares (57.31 sq mi), of which 6,278 hectares (24.24 sq mi) is terrestrial and 8,564 hectares (33.07 sq mi) is marine, surrounded by buffer zone(s) of 36,951 hectares (142.67 sq mi) (18,457 hectares (71.26 sq mi) terrestrial, 18,494 hectares (71.41 sq mi) marine) and transition area(s) of 85,468 hectares (329.99 sq mi) (35,447 hectares (136.86 sq mi) terrestrial, 50,021 hectares (193.13 sq mi) marine).

== Ecological characteristics ==
The Red River basin is shared by China, Laos and Vietnam. The main Red River is approximately 1,140 kilometres (710 mi) in length and covers over 500 kilometres (310 mi) in Vietnam. The coastal areas of the Red River Delta support a complex system of natural, semi-natural and agricultural vegetation types. The natural vegetation consists mainly of salt tolerant species and plant communities, including mangrove, salt marsh and dune vegetation.

The mangrove ecosystem comprises the mangrove forest and the adjacent intertidal area, which represent a transitional zone between the marine and terrestrial environments. There are 26 mangrove species found in the coastal zones, the most dominant of which are Kandelia candel and Sonneratia caseolaris.

During spring and autumn migrations, huge numbers of birds stop en route from their breeding grounds in northern Asia to their wintering sites in the Indo-Malaysian and Australian regions. A total of 78 species of water birds have been recorded in the Red River Delta, including 38 species of shorebirds. Eleven of these birds fall under the category of threatened or near-threatened species, including spoonbill sandpiper (Calidris pygmaea), black-headed ibis (Threskiornis melanocephalus) and Japanese paradise flycatcher (Terpsiphone atrocaudata).

Other animal species found in the reserve include the saltwater crocodile (Crocodylus porosus) and the seacow or dugong (Dugong dugon).

In recognition of the fundamental ecological functions performed by its wetlands, Xuan Thuy was declared the first Vietnamese Ramsar site in 1982.

== Socio-economic characteristics ==
The Red River Delta consists of several ethnic groups resulting in a diverse culture. Families inhabiting the forest generally have two houses, one in the forest and one in town. The main economic activities are agriculture and fishery.

There are five large clans in the area. Each clan has several houses of worship dedicated to its founder-ancestors and large branches of a clan may build separate houses of worship of their own. There are 29 such houses of worship overall. The annual clan celebration gathers together the members of each clan and helps to strengthen relations and foster communal bonds.

== Sources ==
This article incorporates text from a free content work (license statement/permission). Text taken from UNESCO - MAB Biosphere Reserves Directory, UNESCO, UNESCO.
