= Hinduism in Vietnam =

Vietnamese Hindus

Total population
- 70,000 (2022) ▲ (0.07% of the population)

Religions
- Hinduism; Majority: Vaishnavism; Minority: Shaivism

Scriptures
- Bhagavad Gita & Vedas

Languages
- Sanskrit (sacred); Vietnamese, Cham, Tsat, Khmer, Tamil

Hinduism in Vietnam is mainly observed by the Bà-la-môn (Brahmin) Cham people in Vietnam.

== Cham Hindus ==
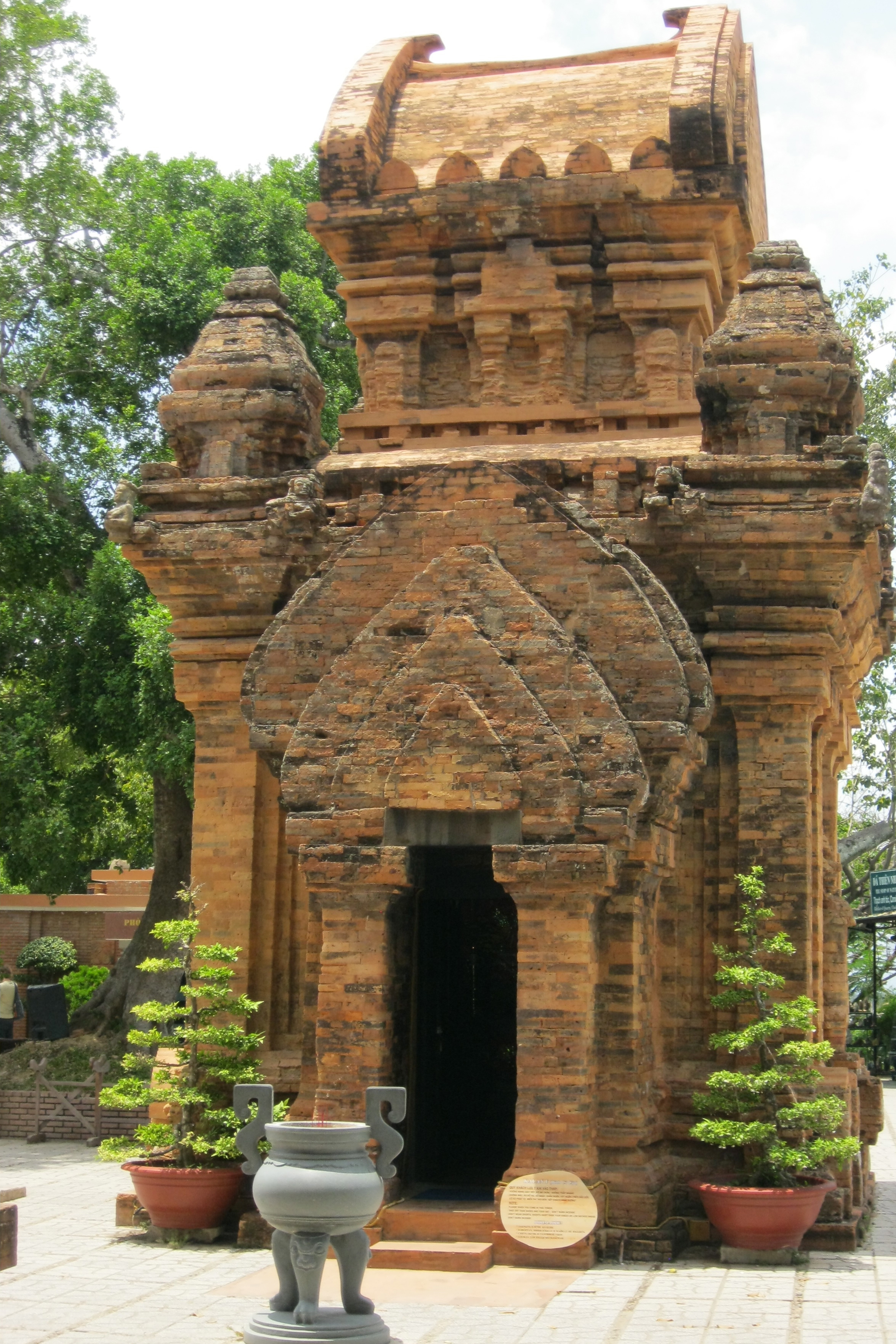
Ganesh Temple in Po Nagar

The majority of Cham in Vietnam (also known as the Eastern Cham) are Muslim just like their Cambodian counterparts who are also largely Muslim. However, in Vietnam, Hindu Chams who are known as Balamon Chams make the minority of the Chams in Vietnam. Hindu Chams are called Balamon Cham or Balamon Hindu. They practice a form of Shaivite Hinduism. The exact number of Balamon Cham Hindus in Vietnam is not published in Government census, but there are estimated to be at least 10,000 Balamon Hindus. Ninh Thuan and Binh Thuan Provinces are where most of the Cham ethnic group (≈65%) in Vietnam reside according to the last population census. Cham Balamon (Hindu Cham) in Ninh Thuan numbered 7,000 in 2002 inhabiting 6 of 34 Cham villages.

Hinduism is practised by the Balamon Cham people of Vietnam, particularly in the Ninh Thuan province (10.4%) and Binh Thuan (4.8%). Four temples are worshipped today: Po Inu Nugar, Po Rome, Po Klaung Girai and Po Dam. Other Hindu temples include: Miếu Po Nagar, Đền thờ Tháp PÔ Patao At and Đền Po Kabrah.

Cham Hindus believe that when they die, the sacred bull Nandi comes to take their soul to the holy land of India. The main festival of Cham Hindus is the Kate festival, or Mbang Kate. It is celebrated for 3 days at the beginning of October. As of 2017, the United States Bureau of Democracy, Human Rights and Labor estimated about 10,000 ethnic Balamon Cham Hindus in Vietnam.

== Demographics ==
Historical Population
Year	Pop.	±%
2009	56,427	—
2019	64,547	+14.4%
2022	70,000	+8.4%

According to the government census in 2009, both the population of Balamon Hindus and other Hindus were included which in total numbered 56,427.

The latest census of 2019 reports the number of Hindus at 64,547.

In 2022, there were an estimated 70,000 ethnic Cham Hindus living along the south-central coast of Vietnam.

== Hindu Temples ==
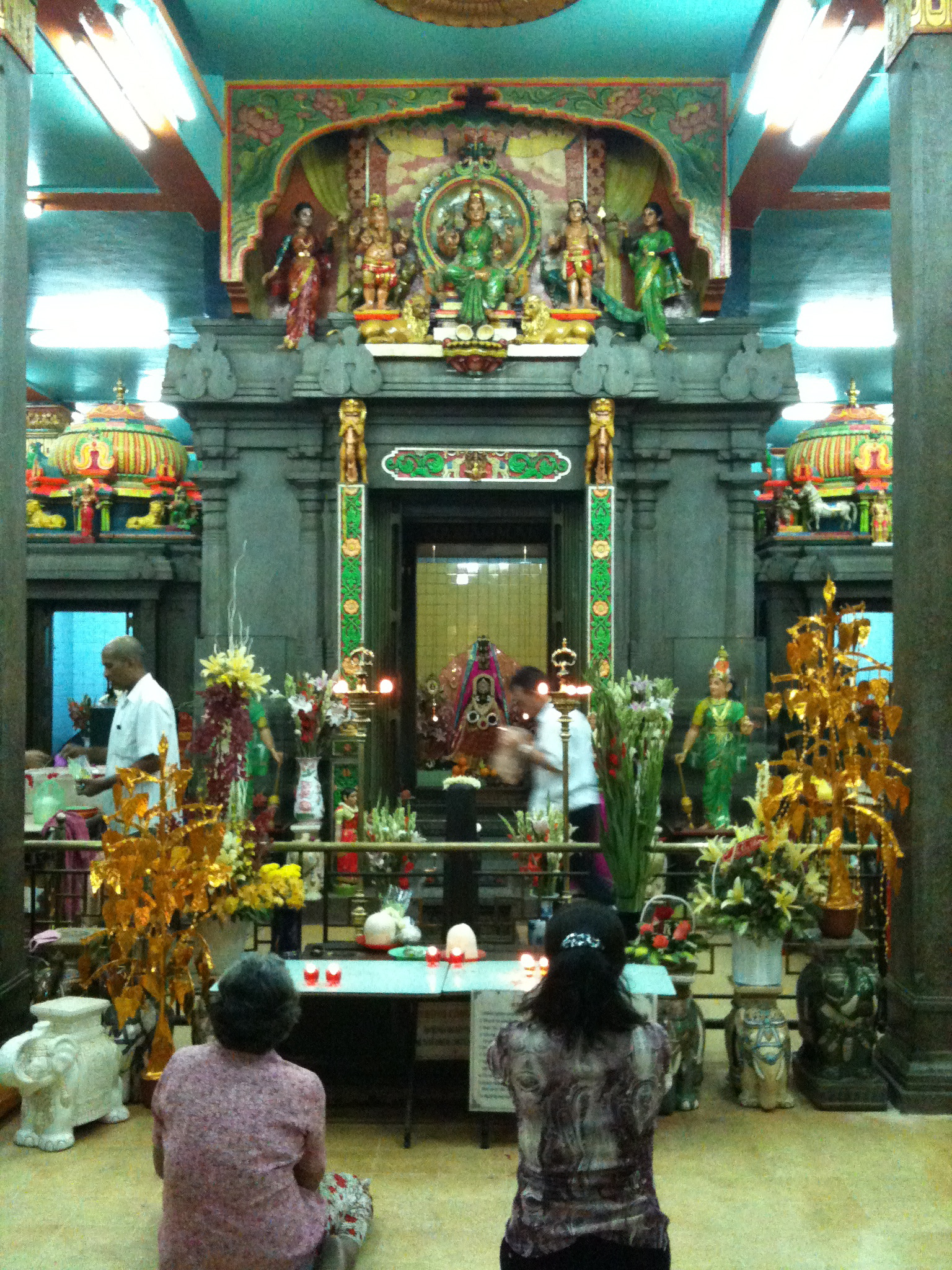
Interior of Mariamman Temple, Ho Chi Minh City.

There are 4,000 Hindus in Ho Chi Minh City, most are Cham and a small minority of Indians. The Mariamman Temple is one of the most notable Tamil Hindu temples in Ho Chi Minh City. It is also considered sacred by many native Vietnamese and Chinese. It is also believed to have miraculous powers and is dedicated to the Hindu goddess Mariamman.

There are three Indian Hindu temples in Saigon (Ho Chi Minh City) - Sri Thendayuthapani temple, Subramaniam Swamy temple and Mariamman Temple.

=== Ancient Cham Hindu Temples ===
- Po Klong Garai Temple
- Po Nagar
- Mỹ Sơn

== See also ==
- Mariamman Temple, Ho Chi Minh City
- Religion in Vietnam
- Hinduism in Indonesia
- Hinduism in Southeast Asia
