= Mariamman Temple, Ho Chi Minh City =

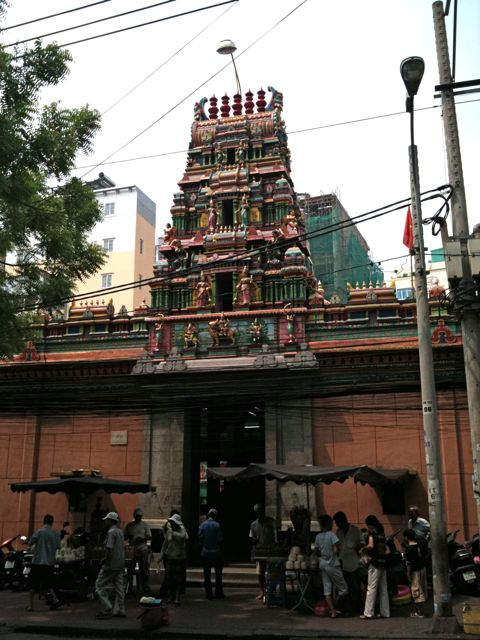
- Front entrance of the Mariamman Temple

- Location within Ho Chi Minh City

Religion
- Affiliation: Hinduism
- Deity: Mariamman

Location
- Location: Bến Thành, Ho Chi Minh City
- Country: Vietnam
- Interactive map of Mariamman Temple, Ho Chi Minh City
- Coordinates: 10.7723°N 106.6956°E

Architecture
- Founder: Palaniappa chettiar
- Established: 19th Century

The Mariamman Temple in Ho Chi Minh City, Vietnam, is a temple dedicated to the Hindu goddess Mariamman. It was built in the late 19th century by the Nagarathar a trade community from Tamil Nadu, India. The temple is now under the management of the Vietnamese Indian Children brought up by Late priest Attangudi Lakshmanan Chettiar who previously used to be the priest who managed the Thenday Yutthapani Temple at 66, Tôn Thất Thiệp Street, District 1, Ho Chi Minh City (now the ward of Saigon), near Saigon Centre.

== Architecture ==
In the outer hall, Parvati's sons Ganesha and Muruga are on her right and left, respectively. The Raja-gopuram of this temple is about 12m high and contains a number of statues. Statues of Lakshmi, Murugan and other devas dot the hallways.

The main feature of the temple are the various statues of Mariamman, which surround the outer walls of the temple. These include Nataraja, Shiva, Brahma, Vishnu, Kali, Biramasakthi, Samundi, Thirumagal, Mageswari, Meenatchi, Valambigai, Andal, Kamatchiamman, Karumari-amman, Sivagami and Parvati who has Murugan in her lap.

There is also a huge mandapam or main hall inside the kovil (Temple).

== Devotees ==
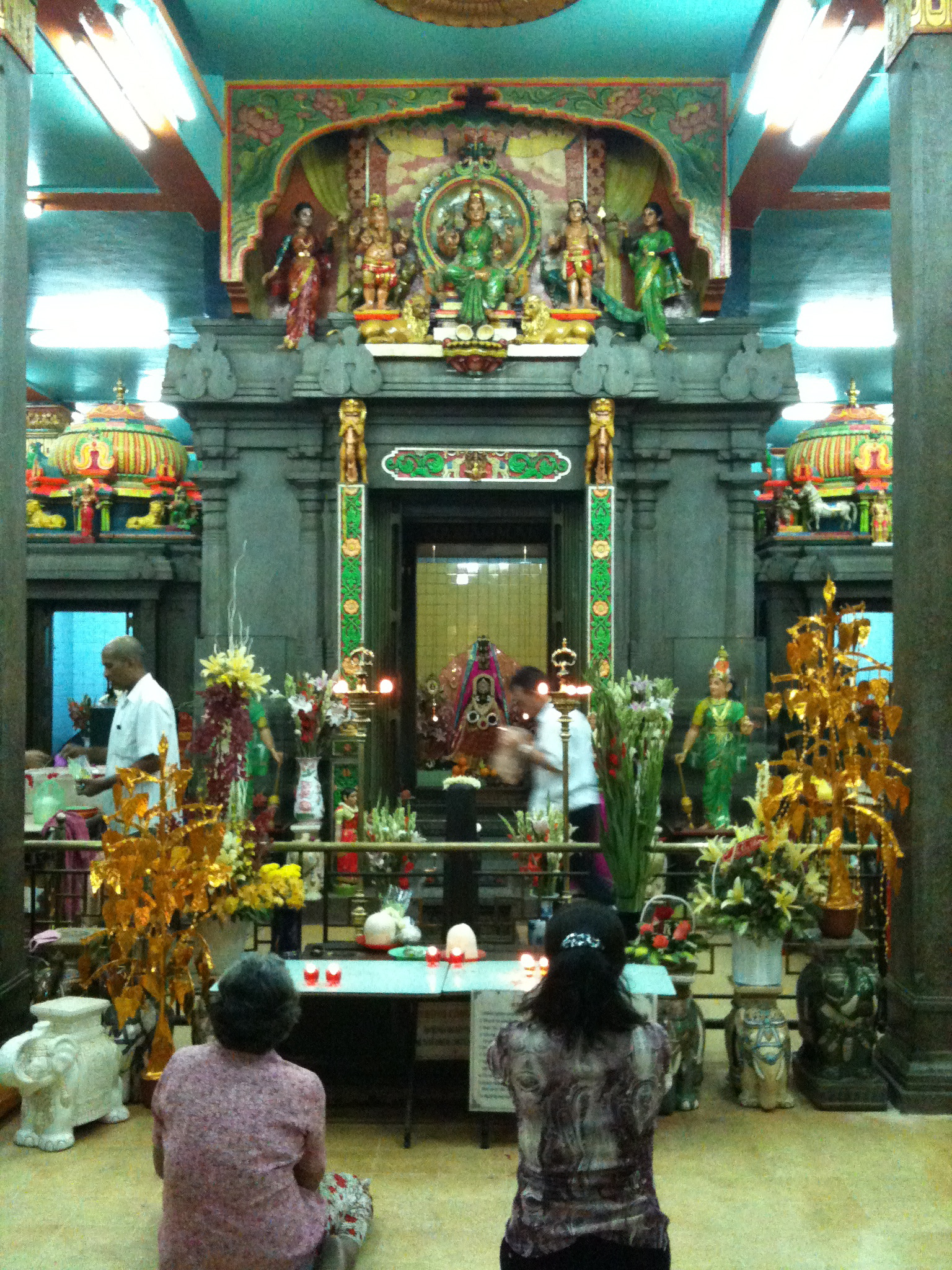
Interior of temple.

It was built at to serve the Hindu community in Vietnam. It serves around fifty Tamil families in Ho Chi Minh City. Most of the devotees are Vietnamese or Sino-Vietnamese who experienced the powers of Mariamman.

== See also ==
- Hinduism in Asia
- Hinduism in Vietnam
- List of Hindu empires and dynasties
