= List of volcanoes in Vietnam =

This is a list of active and extinct volcanoes in Vietnam. Ile des Cendres is one of Vietnam's two Holocene volcanoes, i.e. those that have been active in the Holocene Epoch (which began roughly 11,700 years ago). The last recorded eruption of Ile des Cendres was in 1923.

Name	Elevation		Location	Last eruption
Name	meters	feet	Coordinates	Last eruption
Bas Dong Nai	392	1286	10.80°N 107.20°E	Holocene
Cu-Lao Re Group	181	594	15.38°N 109.12°E	Holocene
Haut Dong Nai	1000	3281	11.60°N 108.20°E	Holocene
Ile des Cendres	-20	-66	10.158°N 109.014°E	1923
Toroeng Prong	800	2625	14.93°N 108.00°E	Holocene
Veteran	-	-	9.83°N 109.05°E	-
