= Telecommunications in Vietnam =

Communications in Vietnam include the use of telephones, radio, television and Internet.

== Telephones ==
Vietnam is putting considerable effort into modernization and expansion of its telecommunication system. Domestically, all provincial exchanges are digitalized and connected to Hanoi, Da Nang and Ho Chi Minh City by fiber optic cable or microwave radio relay networks. Main lines have been increased, and the use of mobile telephones is growing. As of 2012, there were 134 million mobile phone subscribers, making Vietnam's rank 6th in the world.

== Mobile networks ==
- Viettel Mobile (directly under Viettel Corp.): 032, 033, 034, 035, 036, 037, 038, 039, 095, 096, 097, 098, 086
- MobiFone (directly under VMS): 070, 076, 077, 078, 079, 089, 090, 093
- VinaPhone (directly under VNPT): 081, 082, 083, 084, 085, 088, 091, 094
- S-Fone (directly under CDMA S-Telecom): 095 (shut down, license expired in 2016. Viettel acquired prefix)
- Vietnamobile (ex-HT Mobile): 092, 052, 056, 058
- Beeline rebranded as Gmobile in 2012 (directly under G-Tel): 059, 099

At the beginning of 2013, S-Fone and Beeline services are temporarily shut down due to hard competitions with other mobile operators. Beeline, a mobile operator found by Global Telecommunications Corporation or G-Tel and VimpelCom came to the market in 2009. A company with cooperation between companies from Vietnam and Russia ended its service by the end of the year 2012 as a result of G-Tel became the owner of Beeline after VimpelCom sold all stocks to its partner. Earlier in 2010, SK Telecom decided to pull out of the Vietnam mobile market when stopping cooperation with SPT - Saigon Postel Corp. in S-Fone.

== Internet ==
Vietnam ranks 16th in the world in terms of number of internet users.

In March 2025, Vietnam's Prime Minister Pham Minh Chinh committed to fast-tracking Starlink’s licensing under a pilot program, following new rules allowing full foreign ownership of satellite internet providers. This move aims to boost infrastructure and strengthen trade ties with the U.S.

=== Statistics ===
| Year | Users | Nat Prop (%) | International Bandwidth (Bit/s) | Domestic Bandwidth (Bit/s) |
|---|---|---|---|---|
| 2003 | 804,528 | 3.80 | 1,036 | |
| 2006 | 4,059,392 | 17.67 | 7,000 | |
| 2009 | 20,894,705 | 24.47 | 53,659 | 68,760 |
| 2012 | 31,200,000 | 35.62 | 311,176 | 415,396 |

== See also ==
- Media of Vietnam
- Vietnam Multimedia Corporation
- Vietnam Television

== Resources ==
- Statistics
