= List of ecoregions in Thailand =

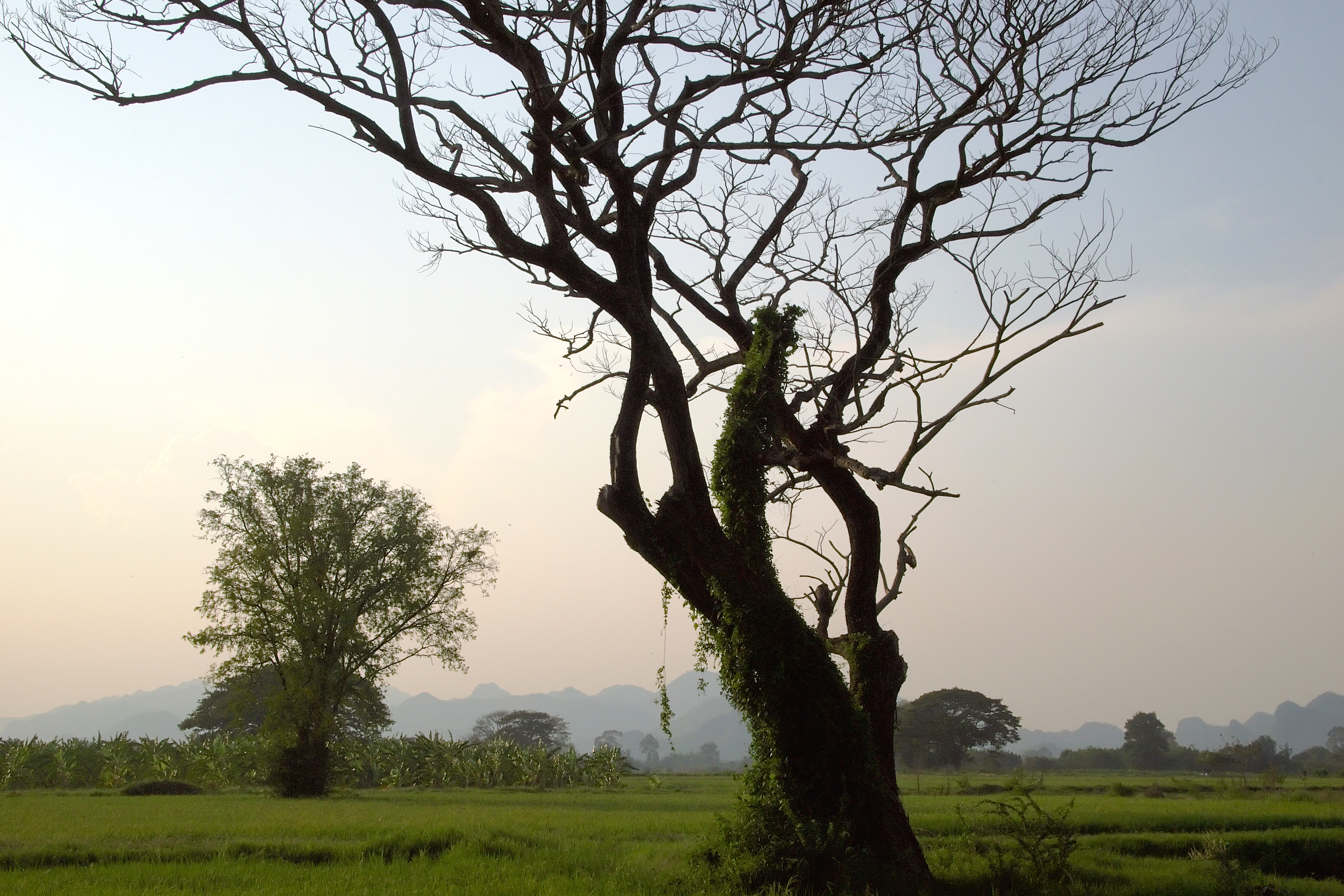
Acacia trees near Kanchanaburi

The following is a list of ecoregions in Thailand.

== Terrestrial ecoregions ==
Thailand is in the Indomalayan realm. Ecoregions are listed by biome.

=== Tropical and subtropical moist broadleaf forests ===
- Cardamom Mountains rain forests
- Chao Phraya freshwater swamp forests
- Chao Phraya lowland moist deciduous forests
- Kayah–Karen montane rain forests
- Luang Prabang montane rain forests
- Northern Thailand–Laos moist deciduous forests
- Northern Indochina subtropical forests
- Northern Khorat Plateau moist deciduous forests
- Peninsular Malaysian montane rain forests
- Peninsular Malaysian rain forests
- Tenasserim–South Thailand semi-evergreen rain forests

=== Tropical and subtropical dry broadleaf forests ===
- Central Indochina dry forests
- Southeastern Indochina dry evergreen forests

=== Mangroves ===
- Indochina mangroves
- Myanmar Coast mangroves

== Freshwater ecoregions ==
Thailand's freshwater ecoregions include:

- Mekong
  - Khorat Plateau
  - Lower Lancang
- Chao Phraya
- Mae Khlong
- Lower and middle Salween
- Malay Peninsula eastern slope

== Marine ecoregions ==
Thailand straddles two marine realms. The Andaman Sea coast is in the Western Indo-Pacific, and the Gulf of Thailand coast is in the Central Indo-Pacific. Thailand's two marine ecoregions are:

- Andaman Sea Coral Coast
- Gulf of Thailand

== See also ==
- Environmental issues in Thailand
- List of trees of northern Thailand
