= Protected areas of Vietnam =

Conservation efforts in Vietnam

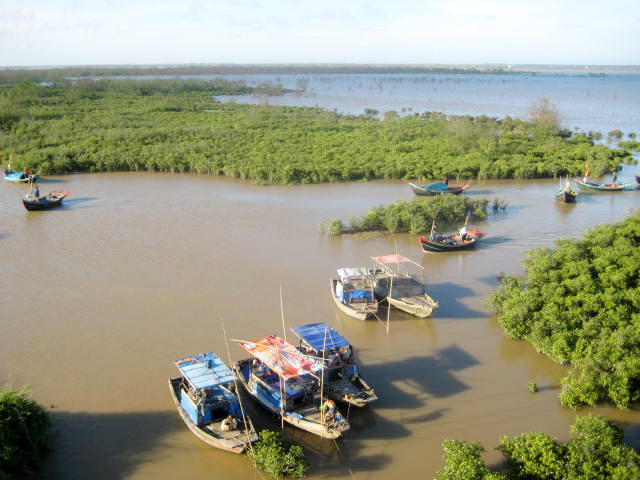
Landscape Xuân Thủy National Park

Many areas of Vietnam are under protection. While the national reserves cover small areas of scientific significance with restricted access, the national parks also cover wetlands of Ramsar designated areas and BirdLife International inscribed bird areas. The largest of the national parks initially covered were the Cúc Phương National Park, the Cát Tiên National Park, and the Côn Đảo National Park which to start with were forest areas cum reserves or prohibited areas. The objective for creating national parks was to allow access to the reserved areas as a part of ecotourism and cultural needs with full attention to the basic approach of conservation of natural environmental resources.

The national parks and reserves, as per present status, (as reported by the National Parks of Vietnam) conforming to the topography of the country which cover terrestrial, deltas of rivers, and coastal zones are: Five national parks and four reserves in the Mekong Delta; two national parks in the northeastern area; five reserves in the north western area; three parks in the Red River Delta; two parks and one reserve in the North Central Coastal area; two reserves in South Central Coastal area; three parks and one reserve in Central Highlands; one park and one reserve in south eastern area.

== Legislation ==
The earliest enabling law passed was the principal legal and regulatory framework for Special Use Forests in the 1986 Decision of the Minister of Forestry. Under the Decision 1171/QD of 1986, protected areas broadly categorized were: Category I: National Parks, Category II: Nature Reserves and Cultural, Historical and Environmental Areas. IUCN guidelines of 1978 formed the basic principle. In 1986 alone, seven National Parks, 49 Nature Reserves and 31 Cultural, Historical and Environment Areas came to be established. This activity was further boosted when, in 1999, the Ministry of Agriculture and Rural Development (MARD) decided to expand the area under protection from 10,000 square kilometres (3,900 sq mi) to 20,000 square kilometres (7,700 sq mi). This decision led to drafting a legal act to cover: Category I - Ten National Parks covering an area of 254,807 hectares (629,640 acres) of IUCN Category II; Category II - 53 Nature Reserves to cover 1,441,159 hectares (3,561,180 acres) of IUCN Category III; Category III - 17 Species and Habitat Reserves covering 488,746 hectares (1,207,720 acres) (gazetted only in 2001) of IUCN Category IV; and Category IV - 21 Landscape Protected Areas to encompass 112,856 hectares (278,870 acres) of IUCN Category V.

Under the January 2001 new regulation, Decision No. 08/QD-TTg, Article 7 of Decision 08/2001 for the management of Special Use Forests (further elaborations have been defined) three sub-zones have been spelt out. These are; strictly protected; ecological rehabilitation areas; and service and administrative – the last sub-zone has provision for not only management specific facilities but also envisages research facilities, tourism, recreation facilities, and entertainment aspects.

Having signed the Convention on International Trade in Endangered Species of Wild Fauna and Flora (CITES) also known as Washington Convention and the Cartagena Protocol, Vietnam has made changes in its laws and regulations from time to time to keep pace with the changing scenario of wildlife trade practices.

== National Parks ==
=== Cúc Phương National Park ===
Cúc Phương National Park covers an area of 22,000 hectares (54,000 acres) and encompasses Ninh Bình Province, Hòa Bình Province and Thanh Hóa Province. It was established in 1982. It is located in the foothills of the northern Annamite Mountains. Flora in the park includes multi-layered canopy of trees which rise up to 70 metres (230 ft) height and flowers, including orchids, ferns with tall leaves. The fauna consists of 97 species of mammals (including notable endangered langurs), 300 species of birds, 36 reptilian species, 17 species of amphibians, 11 species of fish, 2,000 species of vascular plants, and thousands of species of insects. Remnants of 12,000 years old prehistoric man have been discovered in the caves, and also fossilised marine reptiles (the first of its kind in Vietnam)

=== Yok Đôn National Park ===
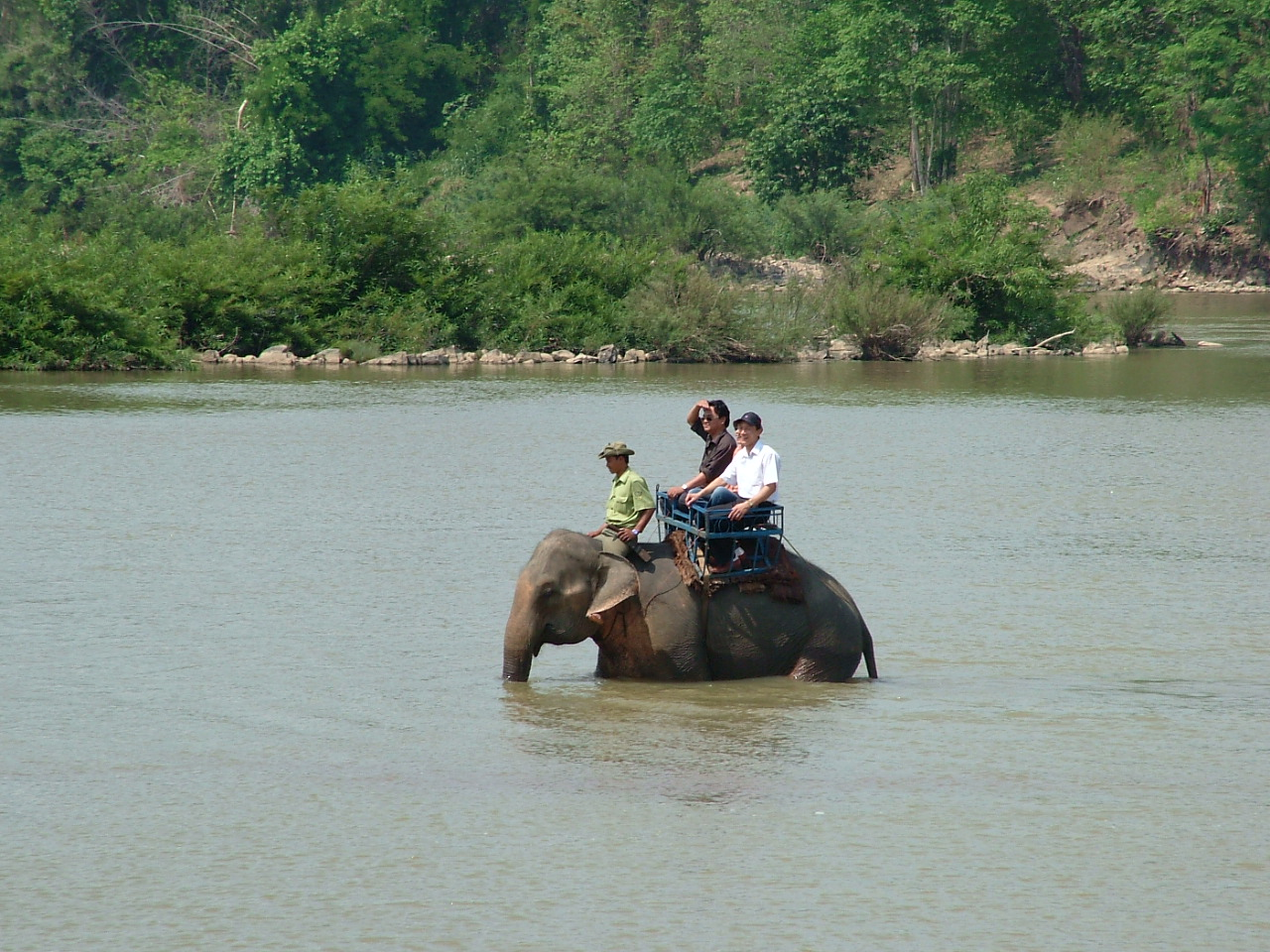
Elephant ride in the Yok Don National Park, Vietnam

Yok Đôn National Park was established in 1988. It covers an area of 1,155.45 square kilometres (446.12 sq mi) and is in Đắk Lắk Province. Vegetation in the park consists of deciduous forest and semi-evergreen (mixed deciduous) forest, with smaller areas of evergreen forest, particularly on hills and along watercourses. 474 vascular plant species have been recorded in the park. Globally endangered species such as Indochinese tiger, leopard, Asian elephant and gaur are also reported. Wild elephants are tamed here, which is tourist attraction.

=== Cát Tiên National Park ===
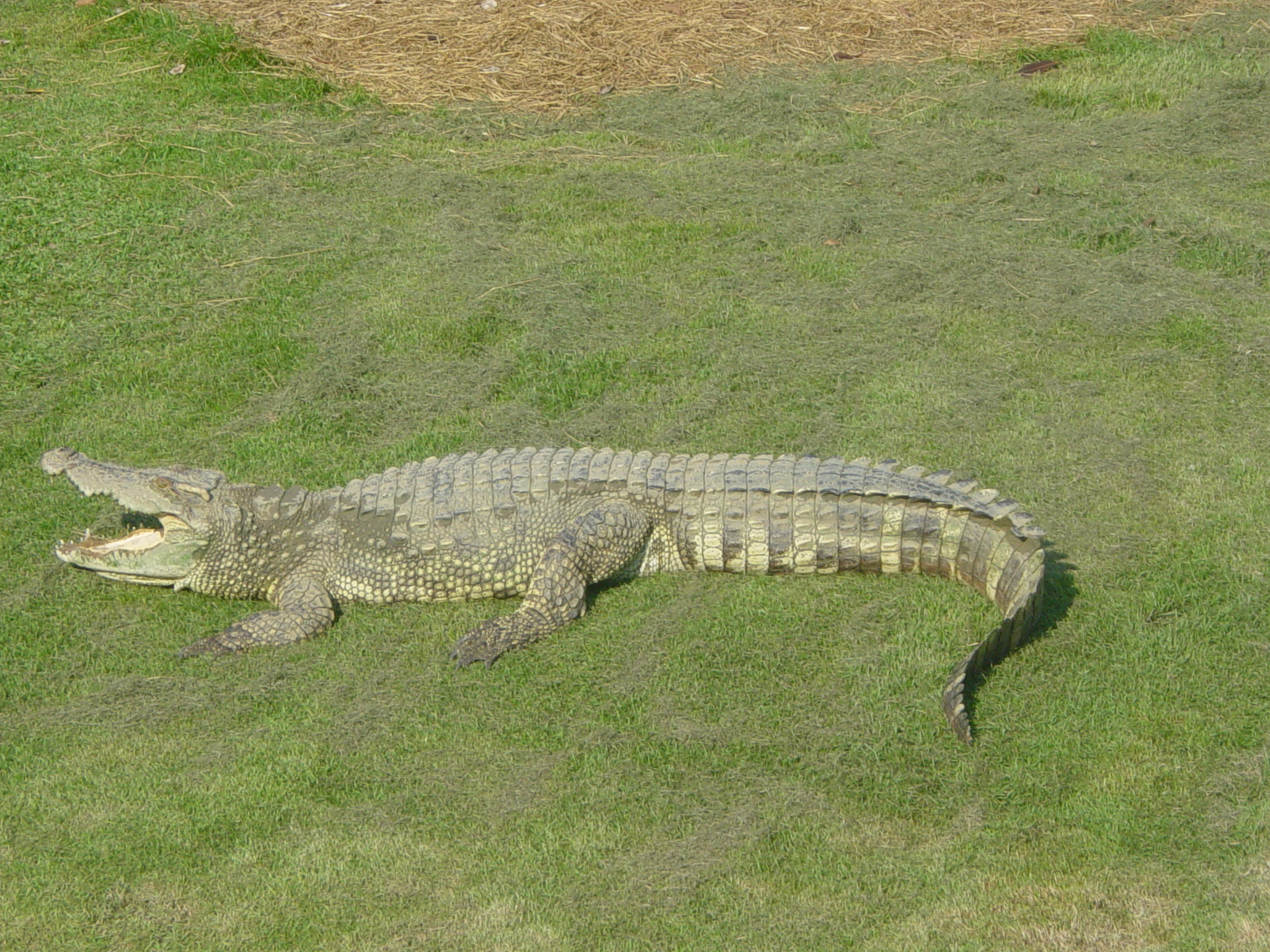
Siamese crocodile

Cát Tiên National Park was declared as a national park in 1998. The park has an area of 720 square kilometres (280 sq mi), within Đồng Nai Province. It has an area of about protects one of the largest areas of lowland tropical rainforests left in Vietnam. Vegetation consists of evergreen tropical and deciduous forest, dominated by Dipterocarpaceae, Fabaceae and Lythraceae (particularly Lagerstroemia spp.), with 40% of the park bamboo woodland, and the remaining 10% farmland, wetlands and grassland. It has more than 1,700 species of vascular plants. In 1992, it was made a Rhinoceros Reserve upon the discovery of a population of the Vietnamese Javan rhinoceros, but these had died out by 2010. In addition 76 mammal, 320 bird, 74 reptile, 35 amphibian, 99 fish and 435 butterfly species have been recorded in the park. Siamese crocodile (Crocodylus siamensis), a globally threatened species is also reported from the park.

=== Phong Nha–Kẻ Bàng National Park ===
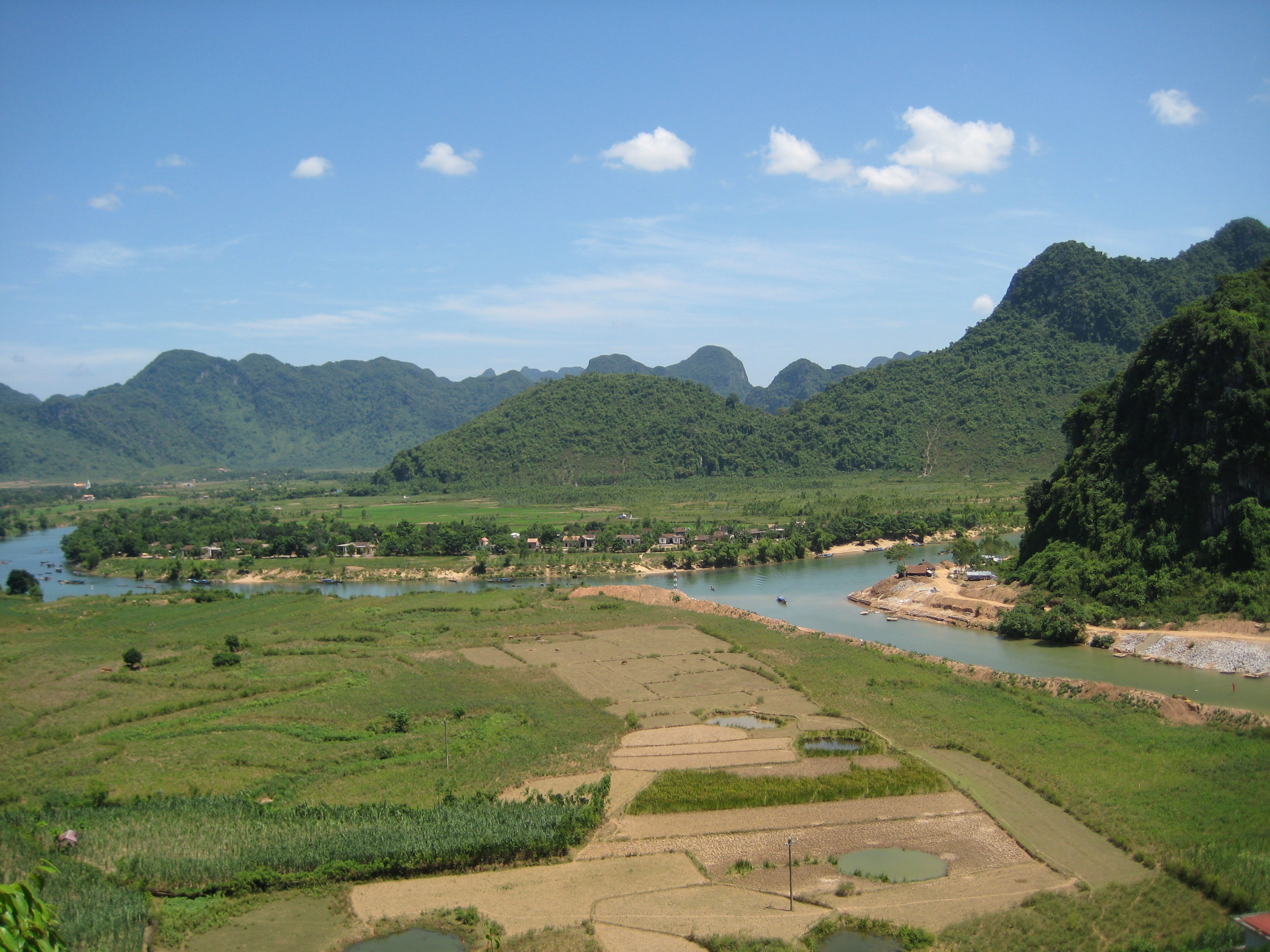
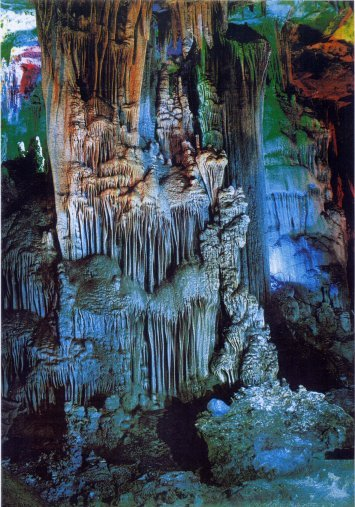
Left: Phong Nha–Kẻ Bàng National Park, Vietnam. Right: Largest cave in the world in Phong Nha–Kẻ Bàng

Phong Nha–Kẻ Bàng National Park was declared a national park in 2001. It covers a core area of 857.54 square kilometres (331.10 sq mi) and a buffer zone of 1,954 square kilometres (754 sq mi) in Quảng Bình Province as it has the world's two largest karst regions with 300 caves and grottoes. It also protects the ecosystem of limestone forest of the Annamite Range region in north central coast of Vietnam. It is also an UNESCO World Heritage Site, inscribed in 2003. The forest cover in the park is of the order of 96.2% of primary forest. In April 2009, a group of cave explorers from the British Caving Association conducted surveys in this park and adjacent areas. The biggest chamber of Sơn Đoòng cave is about 4.5 kilometres (2.8 mi) in length, 140 by 140 metres (460 by 460 ft) in size was discovered. With these dimensions, Sơn Đoòng cave overtakes Deer Cave in Malaysia to take the title of the world's largest cave.

=== Lò Gò–Xa Mát National Park ===
Lò Gò–Xa Mát National Park is located in Tây Ninh Province and covers an area of 36,883 hectares (91,140 acres). It was declared a national park in 1993. It has 21,982 hectares (54,320 acres) of natural forest and 1,351 hectares (3,340 acres) of plantation forest. Forest types are elfin forest in 600 hectares (1,500 acres). Tree species in this forest type is high, with the Fabaceae, Dipterocarpaceae, Meliace conifer species, Burseraceae, Myrtaceae and Anacardiaceae families. Lower montane evergreen forest, reptile and amphibian species have been recorded here. It is an Important Bird Area.

=== Cát Bà National Park ===
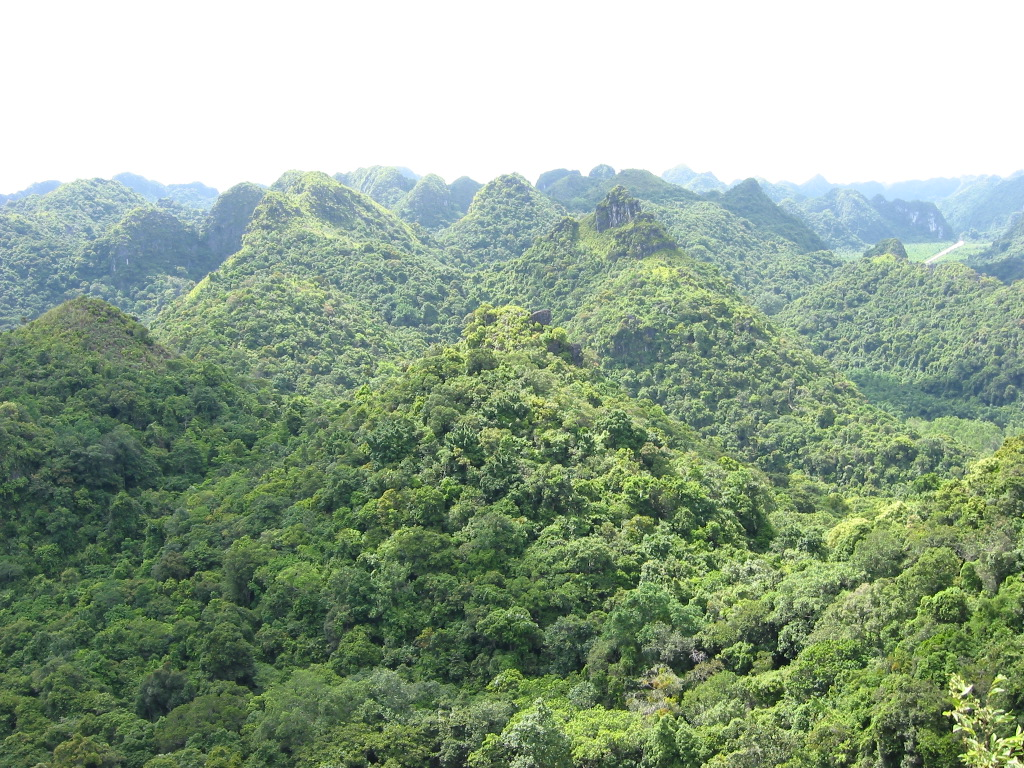
Cát Bà National Park

Cát Bà National Park is located in Cát Hải District of Hai Phong, the park covers an area of 15,200 hectares (38,000 acres) and was by law declared a national park in March 1986. It also encompasses a few small islands and marine areas of the east of Cat Ba island. Primarily a limestone forest area, it has 839 vascular plant species which include 25 species which are listed in the Red Data Book of Vietnam. It is the only park in the world where Cat Ba langur (Trachypithecus poliocephalus) species is reported. Some species of snails are also reported.

=== Phú Quốc National Park ===
Phú Quốc National Park covers an area of 31,422 hectares (77,650 acres) (includes strictly protected area of 8,603 hectares (21,260 acres), biological restoration area of 22,603 hectares (55,850 acres), and administrative and services area of 33 hectares (82 acres)) in Kiên Giang Province in the Northern Phú Quốc island. It was gazetted as national park in June 2001. The highest mountain in the park is Mount Chua which rises to a height of 603 metres (1,978 ft). Vegetation in park is mostly of consists of lowland evergreen forest; 929 plant species have been recorded so far. other wildlife data are yet to be evaluated.

=== Tam Đảo National Park ===
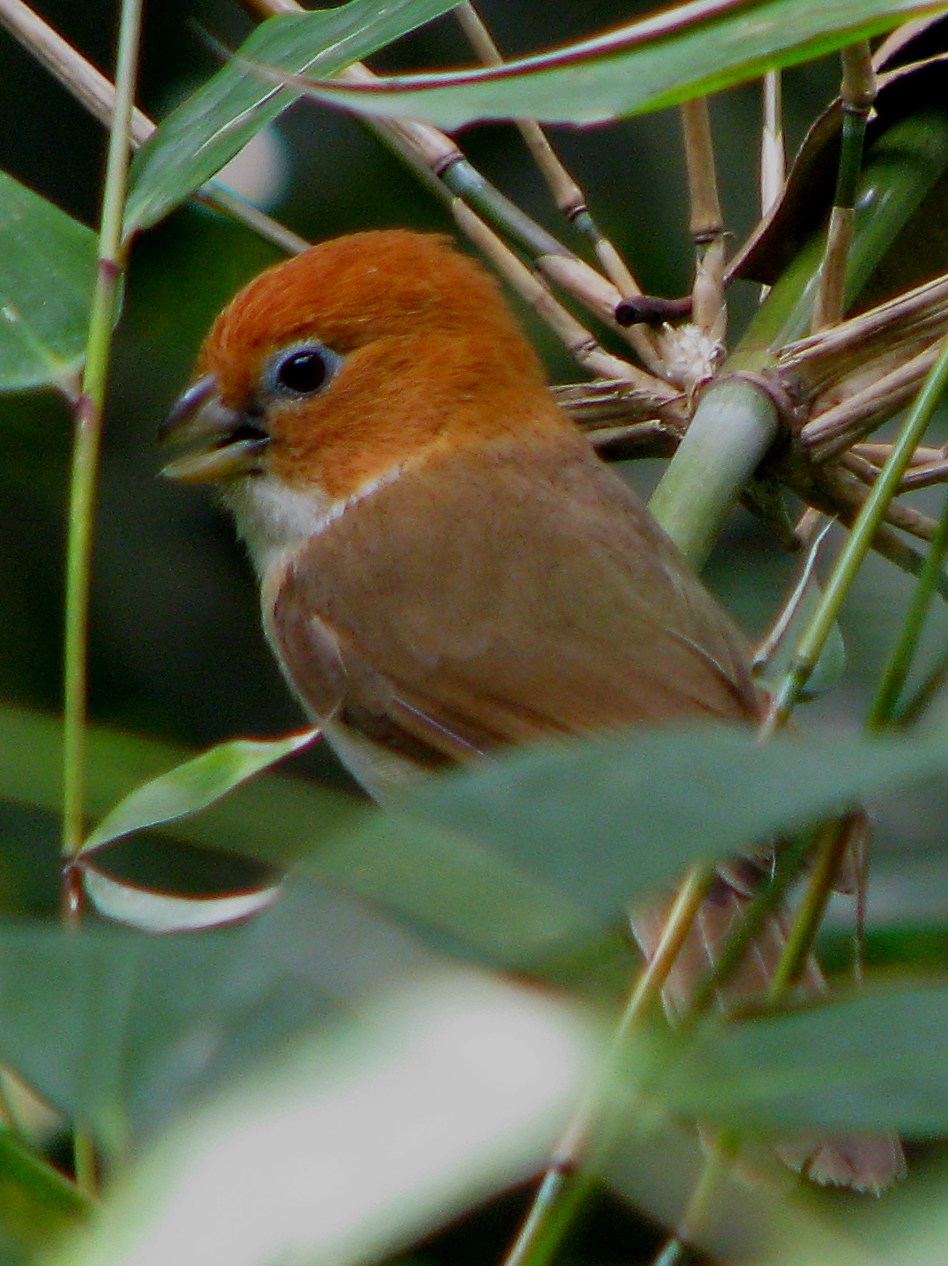
Rufous-headed Parrotbill Paradoxornis ruficeps

Gazetted in 1996 to cover an area of 36,883 hectares (91,140 acres), Tam Đảo National Park encompasses the provinces of Vĩnh Phúc, Thái Nguyên and Tuyên Quang, and includes 21,982 hectares (54,320 acres) of natural forest and 1,351 hectares (3,340 acres) of plantation forest. The highest mountain in the park is Mount Tam Dao Bac at elevation of 1,592 metres (5,223 ft) and the lowest point is about 100 metres (330 ft). Vegetation in the park has high concentration of tree species in the families of Fabaceae, Dipterocarpaceae, Meliaceae, Burseraceae, Myrtaceae and Anacardiaceae. It is an important Bird Area with many biome-restricted bird species such as blue-naped pitta (nipalensis), purple cochoa (purpurea), chestnut-headed tesia (castaneocoronata), pale-footed bush warbler (Cettia pallidipes) and greater rufous-headed parrotbill (Paradoxornis ruficeps). It is rich with a variety of insect species, as also many species of reptiles and amphibians.

=== Ba Vì National Park ===
Established in 1991, Ba Vì National Park covers an area of 12,028 hectares (29,720 acres). Ba Vi mountain within the park, developed as a hill station is a three-humped peak of Vua (1,296 metres (4,252 ft)), Tan Vien (1,227 metres (4,026 ft)) with a temple on top dedicated to the mountain god, and Ngoc Hoa (1,131 metres (3,711 ft)). The mountains rise steeply above the surrounding plain of generally 30 metres (98 ft) elevation. It is 50 metres (160 ft) to the west of Hanoi. Vegetation consists of lowland evergreen forest, lower montane evergreen forest and lower montane mixed coniferous and broad leaf forest and has 812 species of vascular plants. Fauna reported are 44 mammal species, 114 bird species, 15 reptile species and nine amphibian species.

=== Ba Bể National Park ===
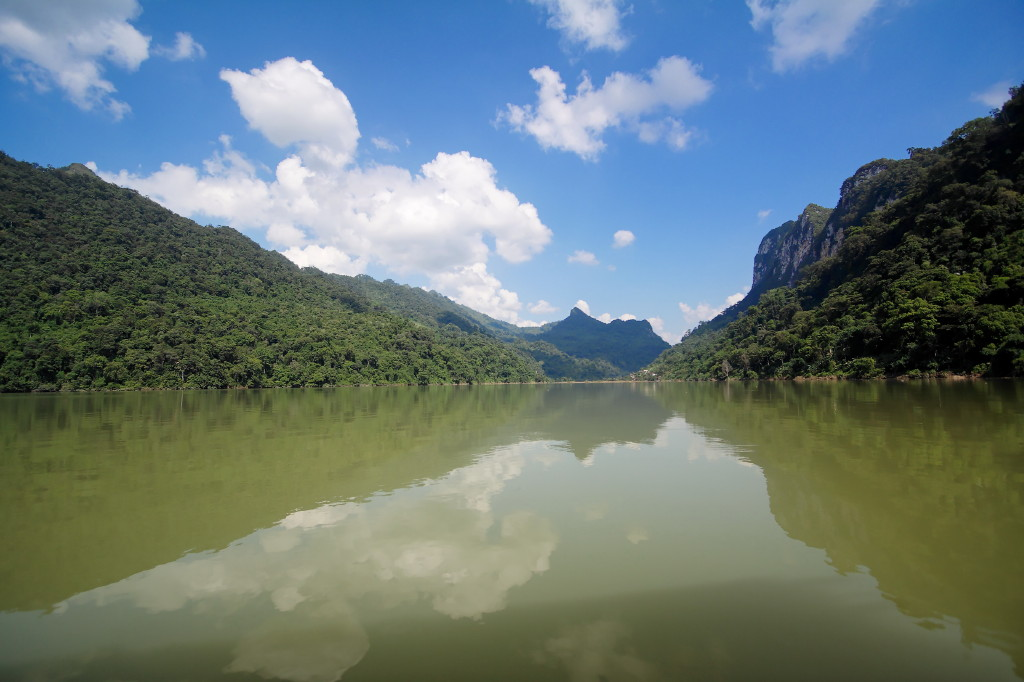
Ba Bể Lake during the rainy season

Ba Bể National Park lies in Bắc Kạn Province. Ba Be means three lakes, which form a continuous water body of 8 kilometres (5.0 mi)length with width up to 800 metres (2,600 ft) and is fed by the Ta Han, Nam Cuong and Cho Leng rivers. The park lies in the elevation range of 150 to 1,098 m. It has limestone forests (distributed on steep limestone slopes), which are rich in ground flora. The globally vulnerable Owston's civet (Hemigalus owstoni) and François's leaf monkey (Trachypithecus francoisi) are found here. It is also rich in butterfly species, about 332 species are reported. There is also diversity of fish species in the freshwater zones of the park, including endemic species.

=== Bạch Mã National Park ===
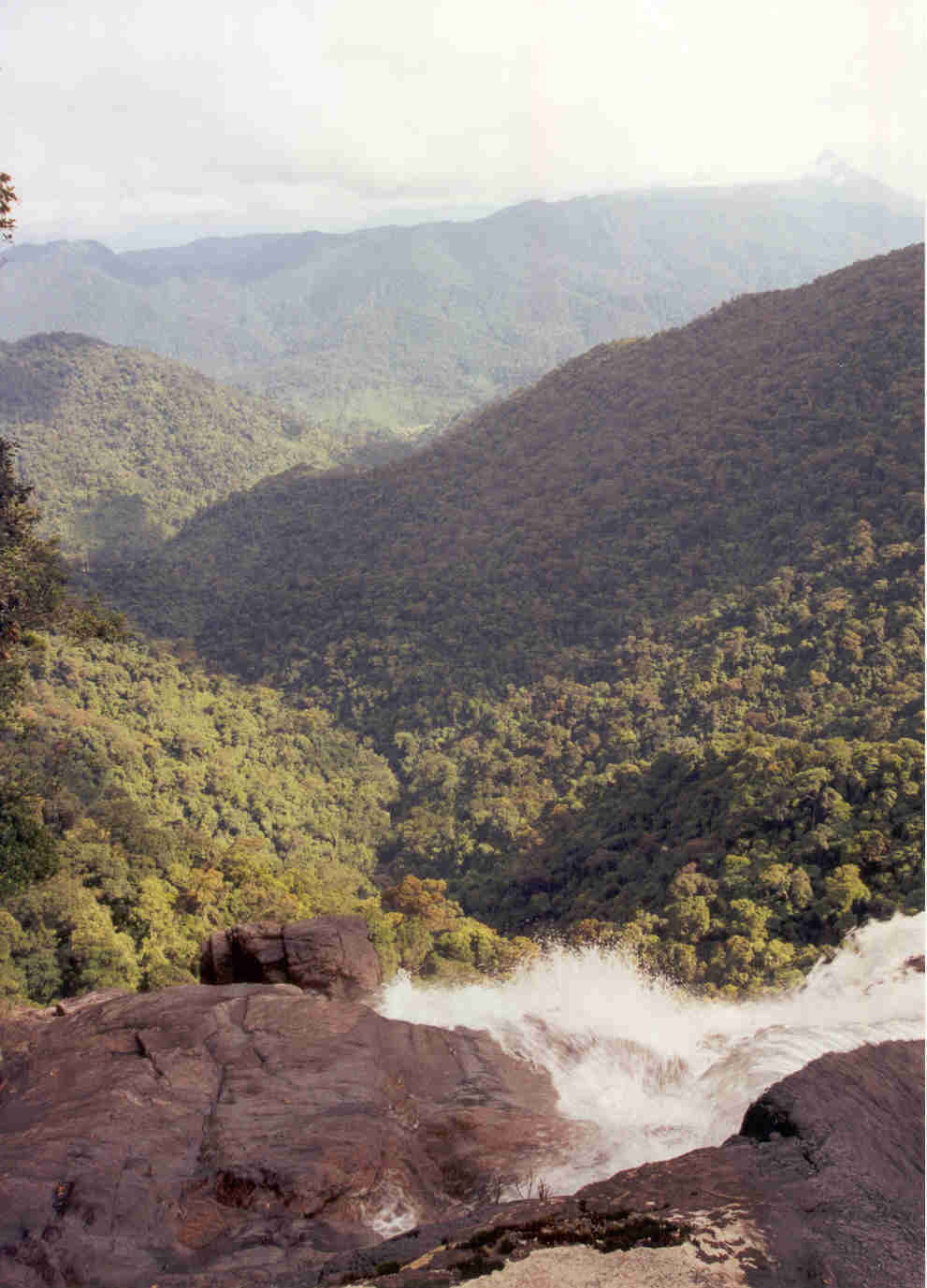
Bạch Mã National Park

Bạch Mã National Park covers 22,030 hectares (54,400 acres), and comprises three zones of a strictly protected core area, an administrative area and a buffer zone. Its habitat types vary from coastal lagoons to montane forest. The Mount Bạch Mã mountain is located within the park. It is the wettest park in Vietnam recording an annual rainfall of 7,977 millimetres (314.1 in), It is considered a 'Centre of Plant Diversity' in Vietnam. The main vegetation type reported consists of moist evergreen forest and montane forest and scrub and grasslands. The park has endemic subspecies of silver pheasant (Lophura nycthemera beli) and Edwards's pheasant (Lophura edwardsi). Asian elephant, white-cheeked gibbons and red-shanked douc langurs are the mammal species recorded but detailed list of mammals in the park is yet to be prepared. Of the 43 bird species, endemic species of crested argus, the Annam partridge and Edwards's pheasant are reported.

=== Chư Yang Sin National Park ===
Chư Yang Sin National Park is located in Đắk Lắk Province, covers an area of 58,947 hectares (145,660 acres), which includes a range of high mountains in the northern part of the Southern Annamite Mountains. The park has substantial area under bamboo forest, mostly of Oxytenanthera nigrociliata and Bambusa procera species, and also coniferous forest consisting mainly of Pinus kesiya coevrig in an area of about 10,600 hectares (26,000 acres). It is an Important Bird Area with grey-crowned crocias, which is endemic and also globally endangered. Of the 46 mammal species, black-shanked douc (Pygathrix nigripes) and yellow-cheeked crested gibbon (Hylobates gabriellae) are key species in the park.

=== Hoàng Liên National Park ===
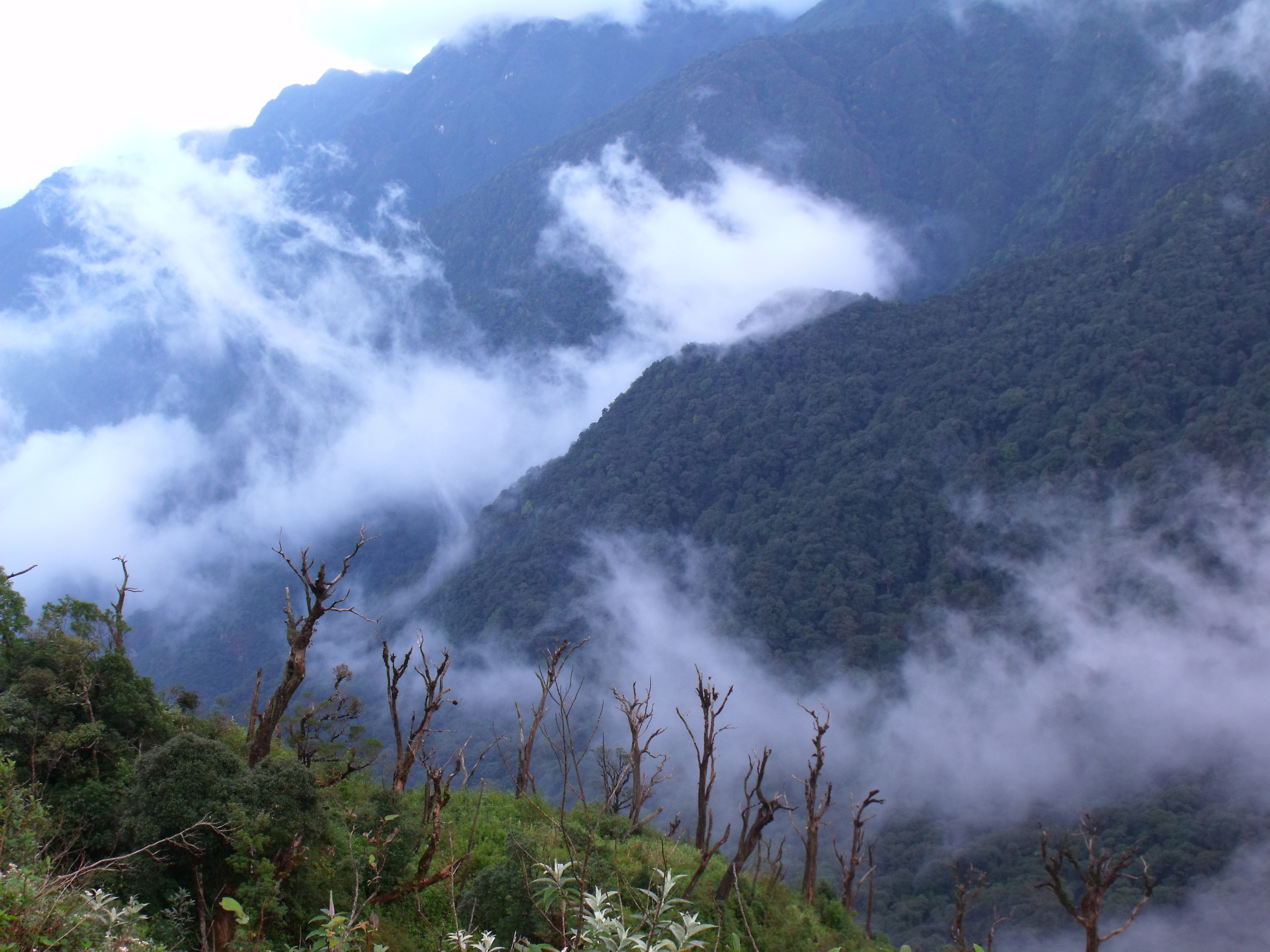
Hoàng Liên National Park

Hoàng Liên National Park was gazetted in 2002 to cover a total area of 29,845 hectares (73,750 acres) of special forests, in Lào Cai province, it includes the high mountain system of Hoang Lien Son range with its Fansipan peak (3,143 metres (10,312 ft)). There is a buffer area of 38,724 hectares (95,690 acres). About 2,000 species of plants including several red listed species) are reported. Ancient mushroom species are also noted in the high mountain areas bordering China. 66 species of mammals (including black gibbon and silver-cheeked langurs), 41 amphibians and 61 reptile species (includes the rare spike frog) and 347 species of birds.

=== Bidoup Núi Bà National Park ===
Located in Lâm Đồng Province, Bidoup Núi Bà National Park covers an area of 64,800 hectares (160,000 acres) and was established in 2004. It is formed mostly of forest area, and is hemmed between two mountain ranges of the Bidoup and the Lang Bian. It is also well known for its richness of endemic species of flora and fauna. Of the 1468 species of plants, 62 are rare species spread under 29 plant families and recorded in the Red Book 2000 of Vietnam. It is a store house of 250 species of wild orchids. The list of rare animals includes 52 species. The grey-crowned crocias, black-hooded laughingthrush and collared laughingthrush are the commonly seen bird species in the park.

=== Xuân Thủy National Park ===
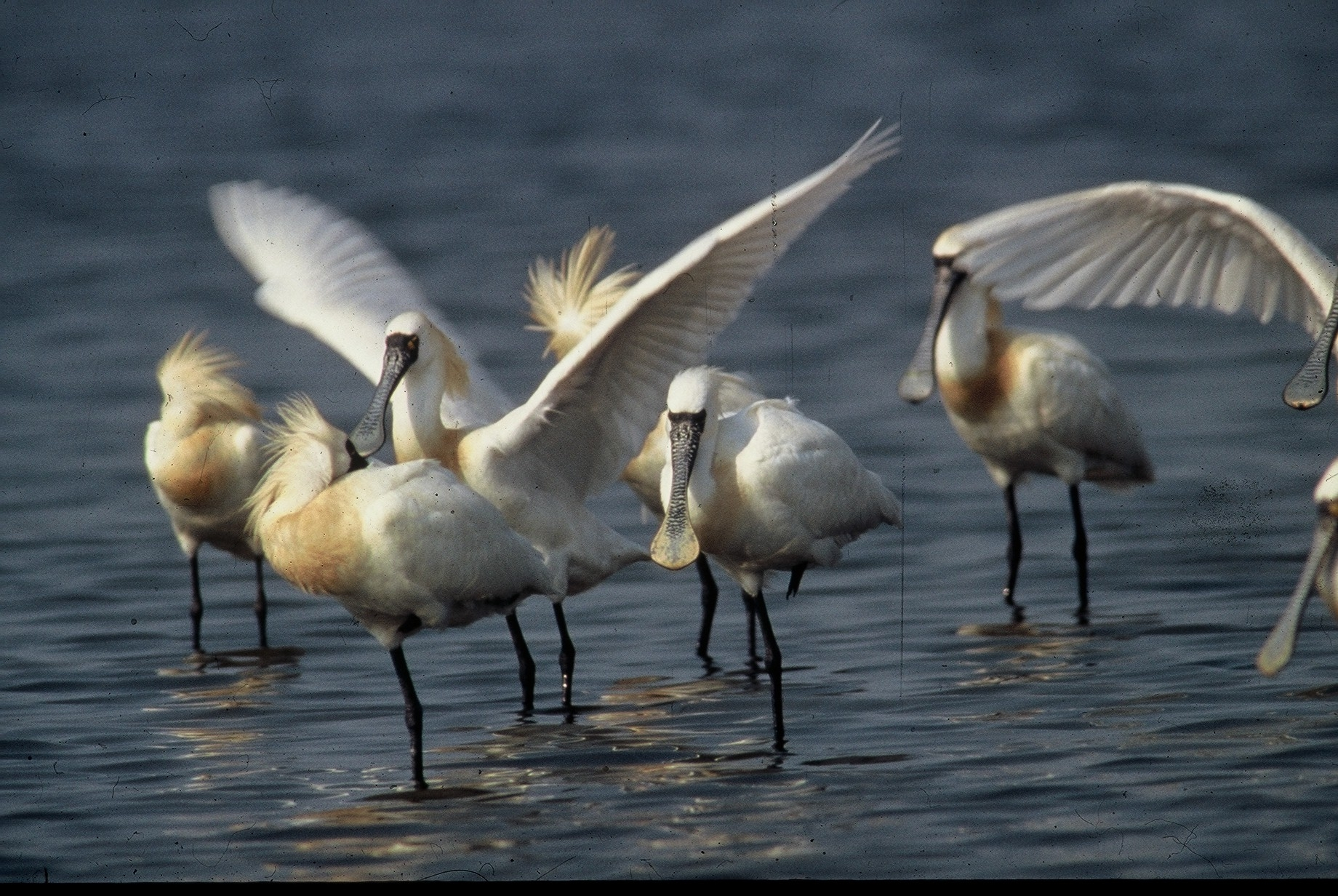
Black-faced spoonbill

Xuân Thủy National Park is within Nam Định Province and covers an area of 7,100 hectares (18,000 acres) including 4,000 hectares (9,900 acres) of low tide wetlands and 3,100 hectares (7,700 acres) of land. It was officially gazetted as a park in 2003. Located in the submerged coastal zone of the Red River Delta, it has been declared as a Ramsar Wetland site. It has 120 species of vascular plants and 111 species of water plants. As a migratory bird habitat, it is a staging and wintering area for shorebirds, gulls and waterfowl in the coastal zone of the Red River Delta. Some of the popular bird species in the park are the Asian dowitcher, Nordmann's greenshank, spoon-billed sandpiper, Saunders's gull and black-faced spoonbill. The park is facing threat on account of aquaculture and high levels of fishing. Shellfish harvesting is also practiced within its boundaries.

=== Pù Mát National Park ===
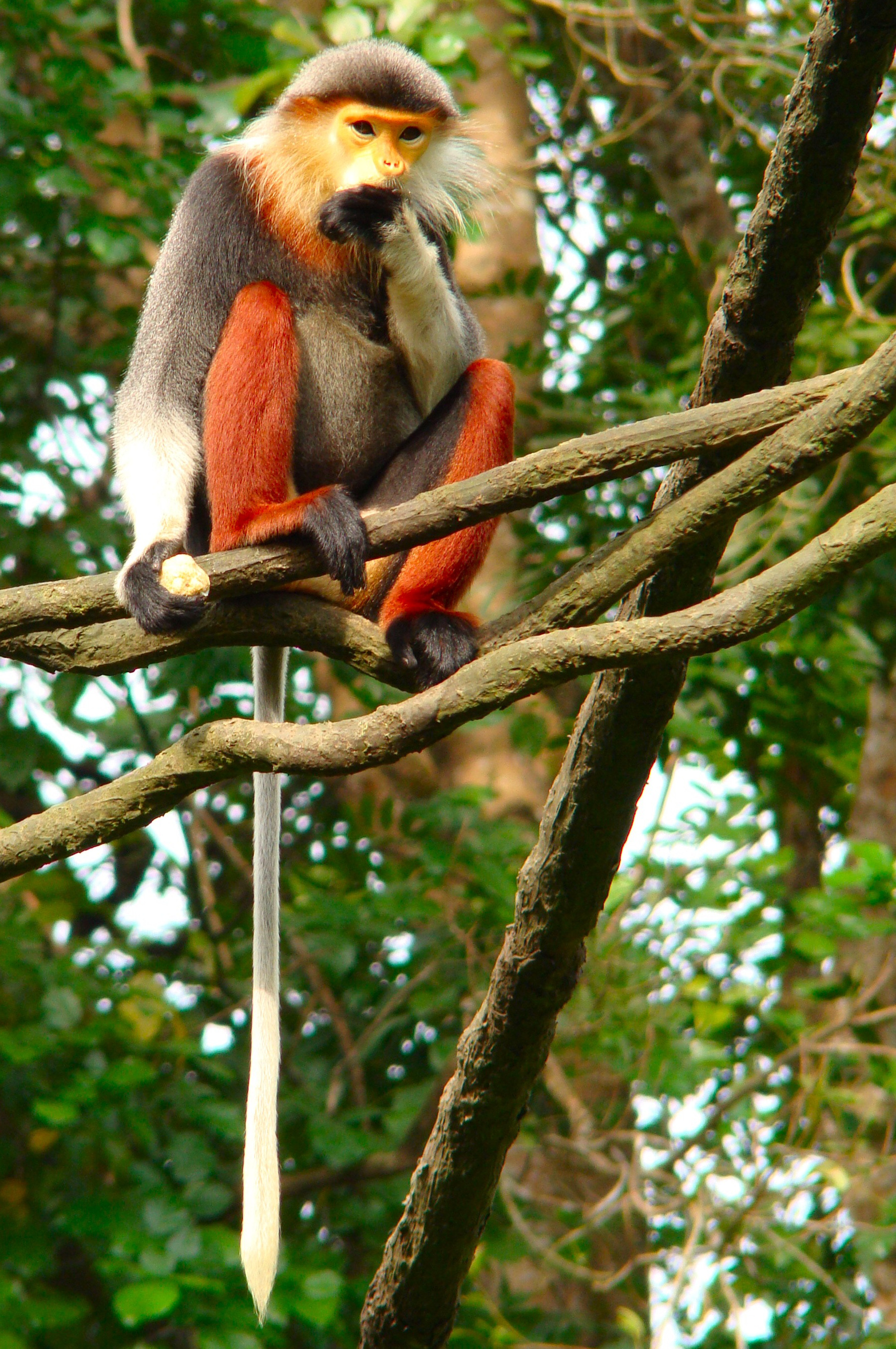
Red-shanked douc

Pù Mát National Park lies in Nghệ An Province and has an area of 911 square kilometres (352 sq mi) (strict protected area of 895.17 square kilometres (345.63 sq mi), ecological recovery zone of 1,596 hectares (3,940 acres) at the middle of the larger Western Nghệ An Biosphere Reserve inscribed by UNESCO in September 2007 (1,303,285 square kilometres (503,201 sq mi)). Pu Mat Mountain (841 metres (2,759 ft)) is located within the park. It is a national park since November 2001. It has a buffer area covers 86,000 hectares (210,000 acres). It is a lowland evergreen forest with 2,461 plant species. Considered as the flagship park, its location is on the Truong Son Mountains, the northern massif, bordering Laos. Saola (Pseudoryx nghetinhensis) was new genus of large mammal discovered in the park. Endemic mammals recorded are five and these are: northern white-cheeked gibbon, red-shanked douc, Truong Son muntjac and Annamite striped rabbit. Other wildlife flora and fauna reported are 896 flora species, 241 mammal species, 137 bird species, 25 reptiles and 15 amphibians. It is also known as "Vietnam's great museum of animal gene pool".

=== Côn Đảo National Park ===
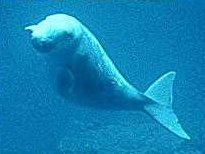
Dugong

Located in Bà Rịa–Vũng Tàu province, Côn Đảo National Park is an archipelago of 16 islets covering an area of 19,998 hectares (49,420 acres). Forest and forestland cover 5,998 hectares (14,820 acres) and a biodiversity marine protected area covers the remaining 14,000 hectares (35,000 acres). The largest of the three islands is Côn Sơn. It was gazetted as a national park on 31 March 1993. Its coastal environment is famous for its scenic vistas and varied coral reefs, which are 300 metres (980 ft) off shore; beach is rocky. Rain forest in the land area to mangroves in the bay is the transition of forest type in the park. There are 882 vascular plant species, 91 species of medicinal plants; 44 plant species that were discovered for the first time on the islands. A number of these species are named with the suffix of Con Dao as Dipterocarpus condorensis, Ilex condorensis, Pavetta condorensis and Psychotria condorensis. Other fauna reported consist of 24 species of mammal, 69 species of bird and 42 species of reptile and amphibian.

There are also 270 coral species spread over an area of 1,000 hectares (2,500 acres). In addition, the marine fauna and flora are of 1,323 species including 44 species in the Red Data Book of Vietnam. The park has the richest diversity of 153 species of mollusc species, reported to be the highest for any island in Vietnam. Seagrass beds are also part of the offshore flora that supports a few globally threatened marine mammals such as dugong. A heritage site within the limits of the park, spread over a 30 hectares (74 acres) area, has many prisons which were part of the French colonial rule and of South Vietnamese regime.

=== Vũ Quang National Park ===
The Vũ Quang National Park was formerly the Vũ Quang Nature Reserve. It covers an area of 29,700 hectares (73,000 acres) in Hương Sơn District of Hà Tĩnh Province, and was declared a national park in 2002. Topography of the park has an average elevation of 800 metres (2,600 ft) experiences tropical monsoon climate with an annual temperature of 23 °C (73 °F). It receives an annual average rainfall of 2,304.5 millimetres (90.73 in). The park has 36 endemic subspecies of plants of the North Truong Son forests. It is home for 60 species of mammals, 187 birds, 38 reptiles, 26 amphibians and 56 species of fish; of these 26 species of mammals, 10 species of birds, 16 species of cattle are rare requiring protection. Particular faunal species of note are the brown monkey langur, Hatinh langur, golden-cheeked gibbon, saola, and large cobra.

=== Núi Chúa National Park ===
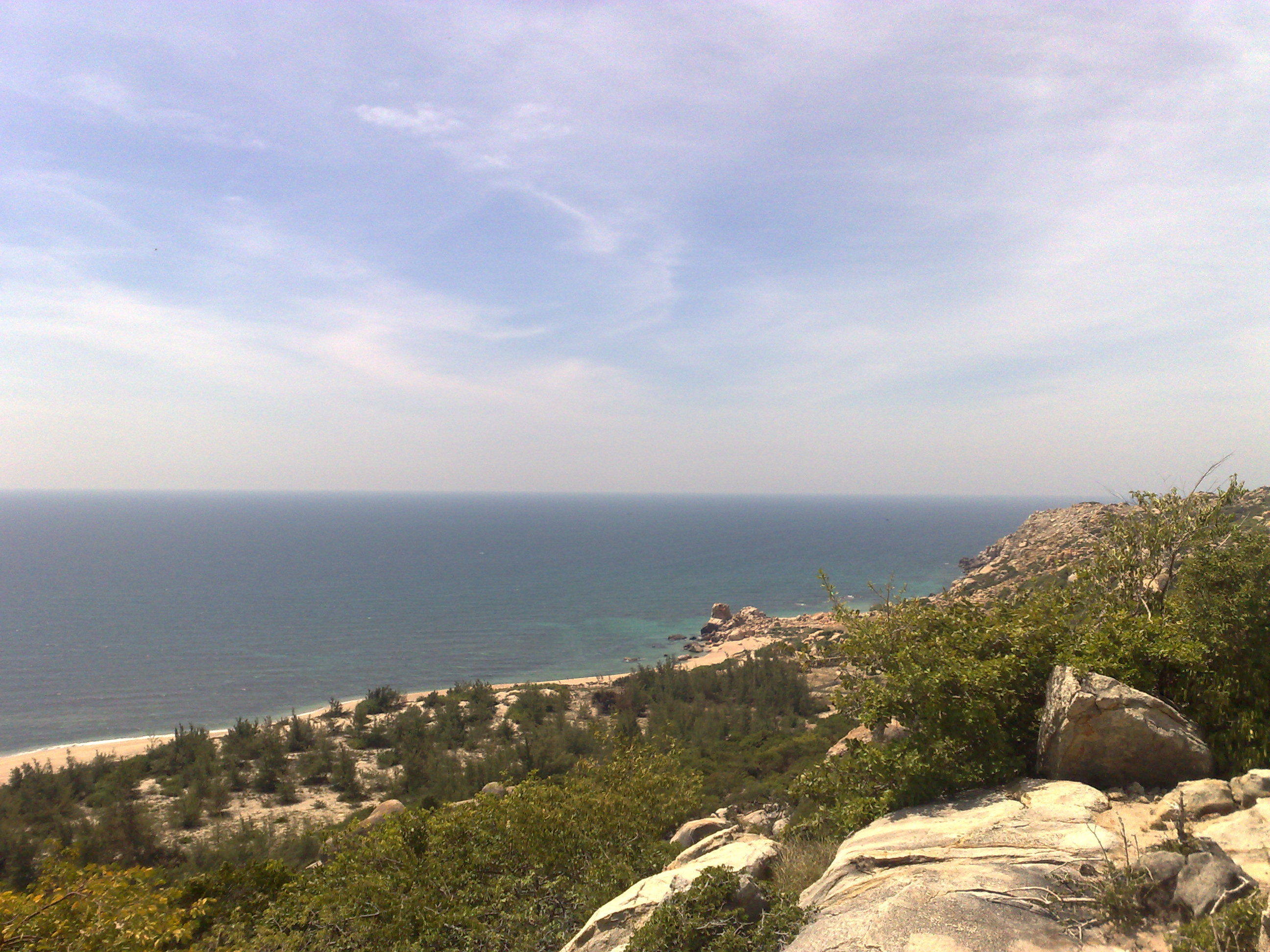
Turtle Nesting Beach, Núi Chúa National Park

Núi Chúa National Park (which was initially a reserve) is in Ninh Thuận Province, reported to be the driest province in Vietnam, and has an area of 29,865 hectares (73,800 acres). The park was established in 2010. It also has the coastal and marine habitats which are reported to be in good condition. The unique original vegetation which consisted of a mixture of evergreen forest, semi-evergreen forest and deciduous forest has been mostly denuded due over exploitation in the early 1990s. The beach where the sea turtle nestle is located on a promontory bordering a marine park with coral reefs; 11 species of turtles, both terrestrial and marine are recorded. Global conservation concerns are serious in view of anthropological pressures in the area particularly for black-shanked douc (Pygathrix nigripes) highest number in Vietnam, pygmy loris (Nycticebus pygmaeus), Asian black bear (Ursus thibetanus), sun bear (U. malayanus), large-antlered muntjac Muntiacus vuquangensis and Siamese fireback (Lophura diardi). The total Fauna recorded in the park consist of 72 mammal species and 181 bird species. Bats are also common; Cynopterus brachyotis is the endangered species out of a total of 12 species.

=== Xuân Sơn National Park ===
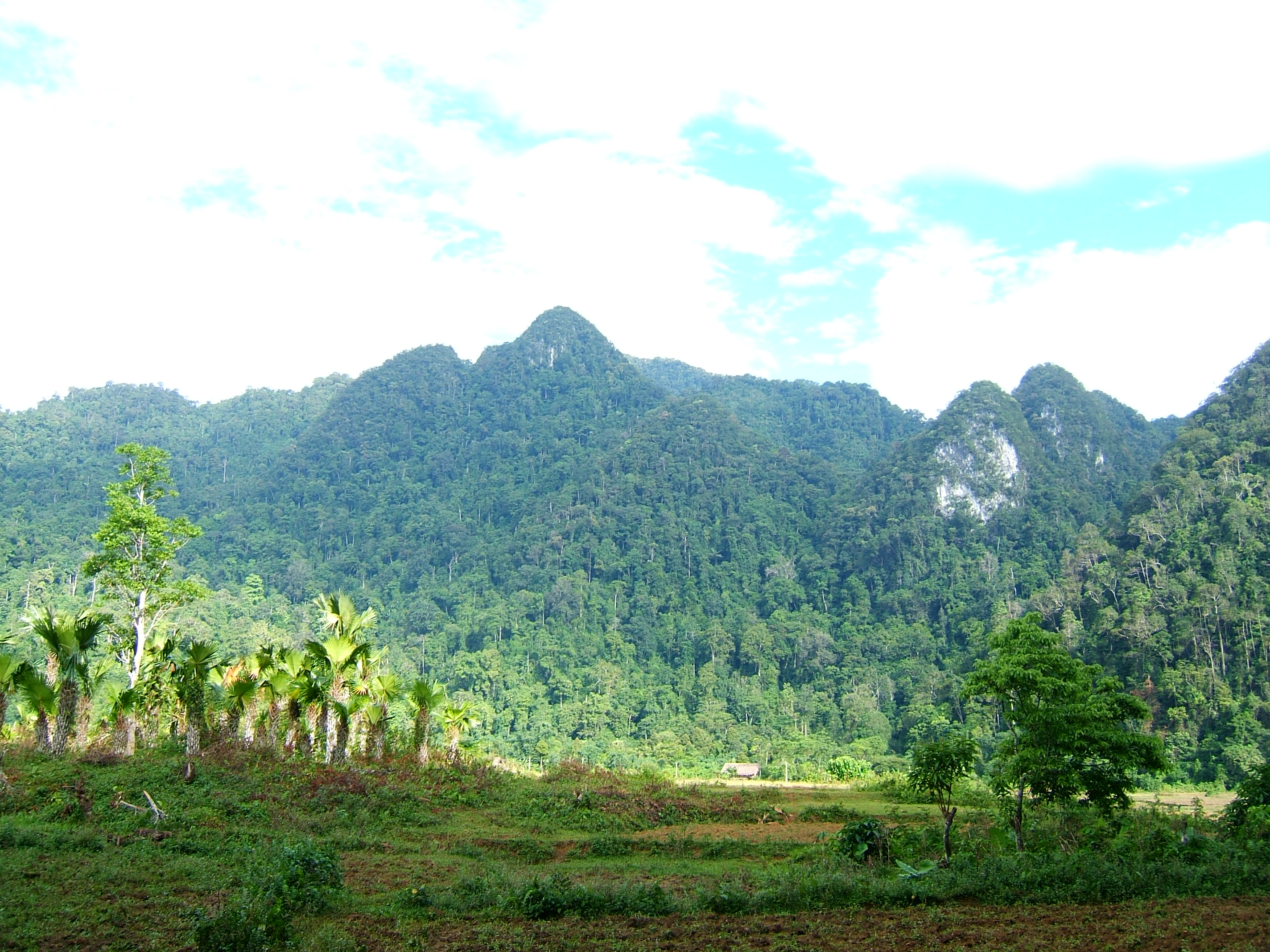
Xuân Sơn National Park

The Xuân Sơn National Park, in Thanh Sơn District of Phú Thọ Province, was initially established on 9 August 1986 as a nature reserve covering an area of 15,048 hectares (37,180 acres). As a park it now covers 15,048 hectares (37,180 acres), with an added buffer zone of 18,639 hectares (46,060 acres). There is mountain system within the park comprising three peaks of Mount Elephant, Mount Ten and Mount Can with two rivers (Lap and Thang) draining the park with a water fall of 50 metres (160 ft); each has many caves. The park has 726 vascular species of 475 genera; of these 52 species belong to the conifer branch. Flora system also include chestnut, oak and magnolia as also medicinal plants, particularly bacopa monnieri in abundance. There are 365 faunal species, which include 46 species listed in Vietnam's Red Book and 18 species are listed in the World Red Book.

== Nature reserves ==
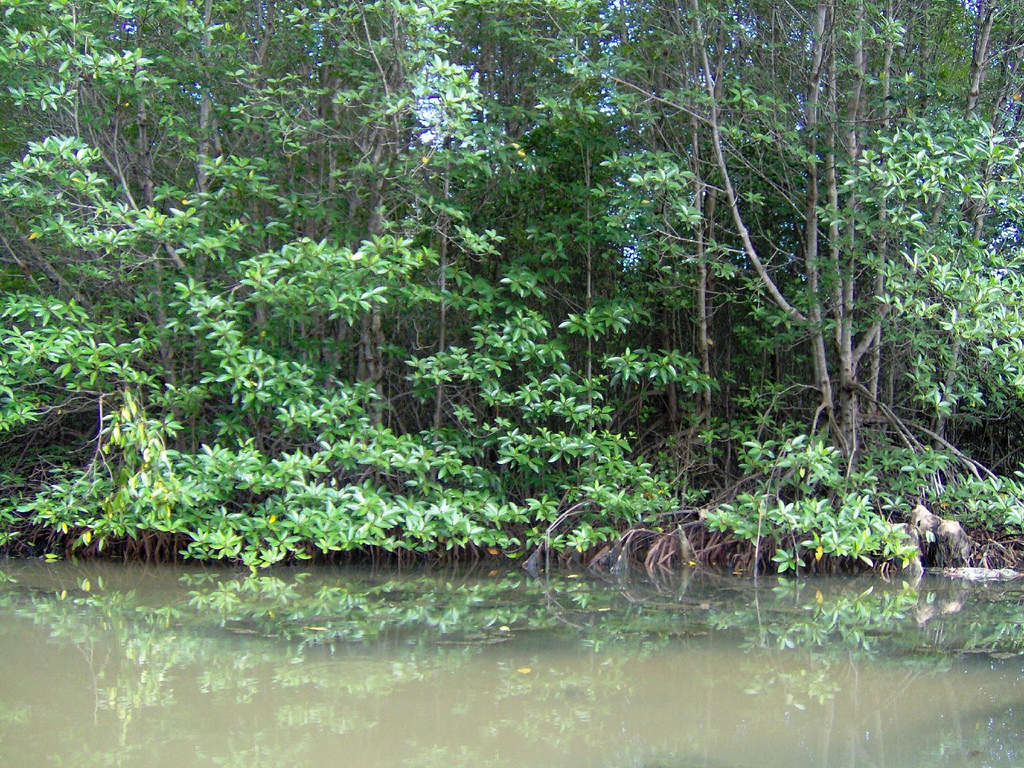
Mangroves in Cần Giờ Forest Reserve

The protection of biodiversity of Vietnam was started with establishing nature reserves of which many have been converted to parks. There are still 14 Nature Reserves, which are distributed over the total land area of the country, including coastal zones. These are: Cần Giờ Biosphere Reserve in South Eastern area; Kon Cha Rang Nature Reserve in Central Highlands; Ba Na Nui Chua Nature Reserve and Cu Lao Cham Nature Reserve in south central region; the Pu Luong Nature Reserve and Pù Hoạt Nature Reserve in north central region; the Muong Nhe Nature Reserve, the Pa Co-Hang Kia Nature Reserve, the Sop Cop Nature Reserve, the Thuong Tien Nature Reserve and the Xuan Nha Nature Reserve in north western area; and the Lung Ngoc Hoang Nature Reserve, the Nui Cam Nature Reserve, the Thanh Phu Nature Reserve, and the Vo Doi Nature Reserve in the Mekong Delta. There is also the Tây Yên Tử Nature Reserve in Sơn Động District, Bắc Giang Province, in northeastern Vietnam.

== See also ==
- List of national parks of Vietnam
- Wildlife of Vietnam
