= Cardamom Mountains rain forests =

Ecoregion in Thailand and Cambodia

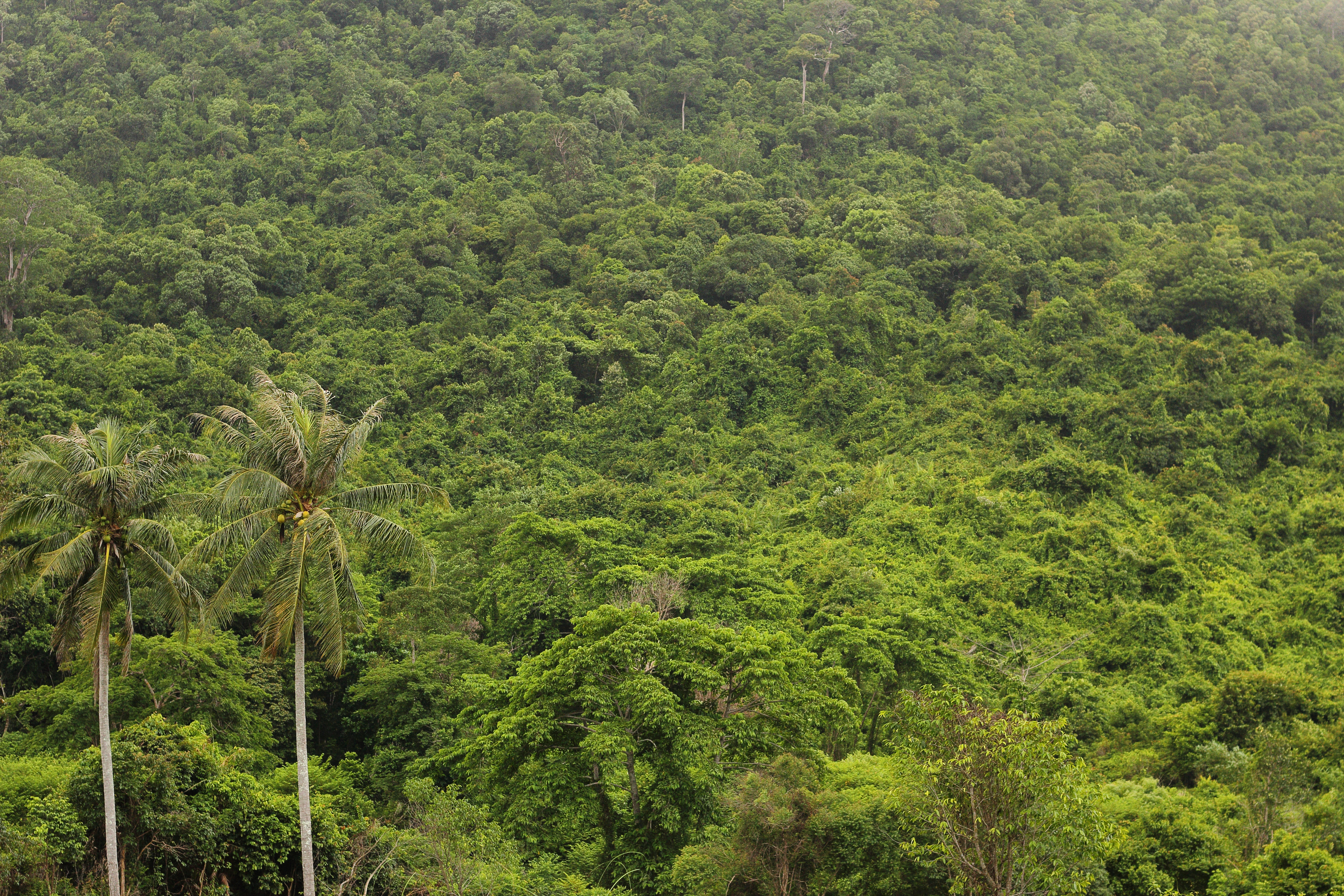

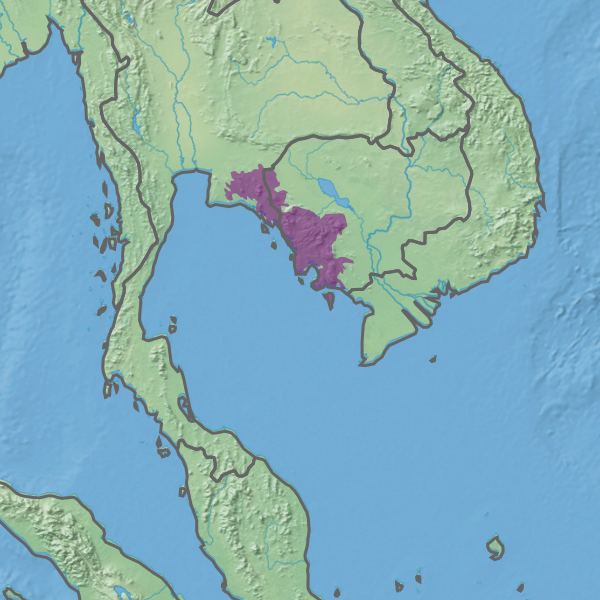
- Ecoregion territory (in purple)

Ecology
- Realm: Indomalayan realm
- Biome: tropical and subtropical moist broadleaf forests
- Borders: Indochina mangroves; Chao Phraya lowland moist deciduous forests; Central Indochina dry forests
- Bird species: 450
- Mammal species: 100+

Geography
- Area: 44,289 km^{2} (17,100 sq mi)
- Countries: Cambodia; Thailand, Vietnam
- Provinces: Chanthaburi Province; Trat Province; Koh Kong; Preah Sihanouk; Kampong Speu; Kampot, Kiên Giang Province
- Elevation: 0-1,800 metres
- Geology: Sandstone with some limestone, volcanic rock and granite

Conservation
- Conservation status: relatively stable/intact
- Protected: 18,647 km² (43%)

The Cardamom Mountains rain forests is a tropical moist broadleaf forest ecoregion in Southeast Asia, as identified by the WWF. The ecoregion covers the Cardamom Mountains and Elephant Mountains and the adjacent coastal lowlands in eastern Thailand and southwestern Cambodia, as well as the Vietnamese island of Dao Phu Quoc.

== Geography ==
The Cardamom Mountains rain forests ecoregion spans a total of 44,288.8 km^{2} (17,100.0 sq mi) of relatively unexplored rain forest. The ecoregion is bounded by the Gulf of Thailand to the southwest, and the Indochina mangroves ecoregion fringes its shores. The Central Indochina dry forests lie to the east and north, in the rain shadow of the mountains. The Chao Phraya lowland moist deciduous forests lie to the northwest.

== Flora ==
There are several forest types present.

Lowland evergreen forests grow in the narrow coastal plain between the mountains and the Gulf of Thailand. These forests have mostly disappeared.

Dwarf rain forests occupy waterlogged areas in the southern slopes of the mountains, with the tree canopy not exceeding 12 meters in height. The conifers Dacrydium elatum and Podocarpus neriifolius are the predominant trees, with scattered Nageia fleuryi and Dacrycarpus imbricatus.

Montane forests cover large parts of the ecoregion above 700 metres elevation. Trees form a dense canopy up to 30 meters high. Trees in the beech family (Fagaceae) are prominent, including Lithocarpus cambodiensis, Lithocarpus guinieri, Lithocarpus farinulentus, Lithocarpus harmandii, and Castanopsis cambodiana. Other prominent trees are in the laurel family (Lauraceae), including species of Cinnamomum and Litsea, and the myrtle family (Myrtaceae), including species of Syzygium and Tristaniopsis. The montane forests are also home to diverse palms, understory shrubs, tree ferns, and epiphytes, including many orchids.

Dwarf montane forests grow in acidic sandstone-derived soils in the southern Elephant Mountains, where the conifers Dacrydium elatum, Dacrycarpus imbricatus, and other trees form a low canopy 5–10 meters high. Forests dominated by Pinus latteri are found on the Kirirom Plateau in the Elephant Mountains.

The Cardamom Mountains rain forests are part of the regional Indo-Burma Hotspot, a biodiversity hotspot of global importance with a large biological variation, and home to many rare, threatened and endemic species. The Cardamom Mountains rain forests is home to many endemic species. Because of its remote location, very small human population, and difficult terrain, most of these forests remain relatively unexplored by scientists.

== Fauna ==
The ecoregion is home to several large mammals, including Asian elephant (Elephas maximus), tiger (Panthera tigris), clouded leopard (Pardofelis nebulosa), dhole (Cuon alpinus), gaur (Bos gaurus), banteng (Bos javanicus), Sumatran serow (Capricornis sumatraensis), and pileated gibbon (Hylobates pileatus).

The ecoregion is home to over 450 species of birds, including two endemic species, the chestnut-headed partridge (Arborophila cambodiana) and Siamese partridge (Arborophila diversa).

Endemic reptiles include the Cardamom Mountains wolf snake (Lycodon cardamomensis) and Cardamom Mountains bent-toed gecko (Cyrtodactylus cardamomensis).

== Protected areas ==
The Cardamom Mountains rain forest is one of the last intact rain forests left in Southeast Asia. It is also one of the most species-rich areas in the world, including many rare, threatened and endemic species.

After the Cambodian peace agreements and normalization in the 1990s, large parts of the Cardamom Mountains, and adjoining lowlands of the ecoregion, were designated as protected areas, mostly national parks and wildlife sanctuaries. With the establishment of the large Southern Cardamom National Park in May 2016, nearly all of the mountain range is now under some form of high level protection.

Thailand

- Namtok Khlong Kaeo National Park
- Namtok Phlio National Park
- Khao Khitchakut National Park
- Khao Chamao-Khao Wong National Park
- Khao Soi Dao Wildlife Sanctuary
- Klong Kruewai Chalerm Prakiat Wildlife Sanctuary
- Khao Ang Rue Nai Wildlife Sanctuary.

Cambodia

- Samlaut Multiple Use Area
- Phnom Samkos Wildlife Sanctuary
- Central Cardamom Mountains National Park
- Phnom Aural Wildlife Sanctuary
- Southern Cardamom National Park
- Tatai Wildlife Sanctuary
- Peam Krasop Wildlife Sanctuary
- Botum-Sakor National Park
- Kirirom National Park
- Preah Monivong National Park (aka Bokor National Park)

Vietnam

- Phu Quoc National Park

== Conservation status ==
Even though most of the ecoregion is under protection, it is under pressure from many degrading and destructive activities. This includes construction and infrastructure projects, mining, clearing for plantations, sand pumping, illegal loggings, hunting and poaching (both opportunistic and organized).

The protection laws has been poorly enforced and the Cambodian government has accepted and even encouraged destructive activities throughout, including national park areas. The establishment of the Southern Cardamom National Park in 2016, may signal a change and improvement of the protection enforcement on ground level, as international organisations has stepped in with financing and practical help with park ranger tasks in an administrative collaboration with the Cambodian government. Also, a number of planned construction, plantation and mining projects has been put on hold.

== Ecoregion designation ==
The WWF's numerical designation for the ecoregion is IM0106.

== Sources ==
- "Cardamom Mountains Rain Forests". World Wildlife Fund (WWF).
- Timothy J. Killeen (2012). The Cardamom Conundrum - Reconciling Development and Conservation in the Kingdom of Cambodia. NUS Press. ISBN 978-9971-69-614-6.
