= Central Indochina dry forests =

Ecoregion in Central Indochina

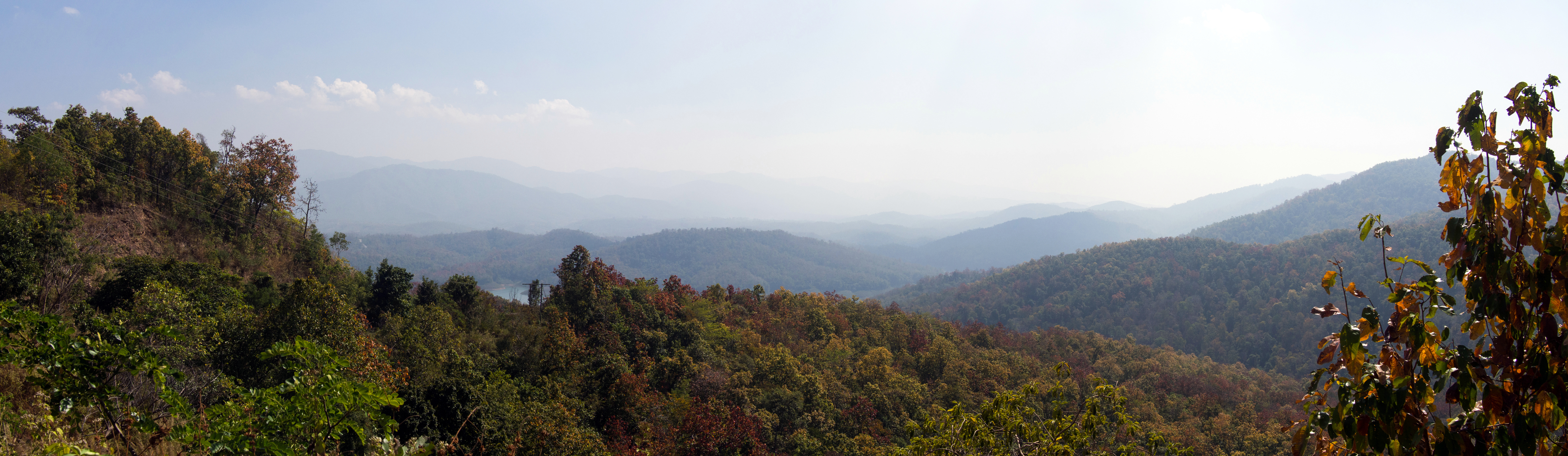
- Landscape of the Phi Pan Nam Range.

- Map of the Central Indochina dry forests ecoregion

Ecology
- Realm: Indomalayan
- Biome: tropical and subtropical dry broadleaf forests
- Borders: List: Cardamom Mountains rain forests; Chao Phraya freshwater swamp forests; Chao Phraya lowland moist deciduous forests; Kayah–Karen montane rain forests; Luang Prabang montane rain forests; Northern Annamites rain forests; Northern Khorat Plateau moist deciduous forests; Northern Thailand-Laos moist deciduous forests; Southeastern Indochina dry evergreen forests; Southern Annamites montane rain forests; Tonle Sap freshwater swamp forests; Tonle Sap-Mekong peat swamp forests

Geography
- Area: 444,000 km^{2} (171,000 sq mi)
- Countries: List: Cambodia; Laos; Thailand; Vietnam; Myanmar

Conservation
- Conservation status: critical/endangered

The Central Indochina dry forests are a large tropical and subtropical dry broadleaf forests ecoregion in Southeast Asia.

== Location and description ==
The ecoregion consists of an area of plateau and low river basin in Cambodia, Thailand, Laos, Vietnam and Myanmar and includes:

- In Thailand the large Khorat Plateau, the higher elevation plains of the Chao Phraya River basin, the foothills of the Tenasserim Hills and other dry areas of the lower slopes of the Khun Tan, Phi Pan Nam and Phetchabun mountain ranges of the north of the country.
- In central and southern Laos the wide valley of the Mekong river system.
- In Cambodia a large area of the dry plains of the northern, eastern, and south-central parts of the country.
- In Vietnam the uplands of the upper Tonlé San and Srepok Rivers.
- Adjacent neighboring parts of eastern Myanmar

These are the drier areas of Indochina with 1,000–1,500 mm rainfall per year and a long dry season when regular fires occur in the undergrowth, some set intentionally to clear the forest or drive out wildlife for hunters.

Great swathes of this ecoregion are densely populated and are used for agriculture or urban development, especially in Thailand.

== Flora ==
While some large areas do remain in northeastern Cambodia, much of the original deciduous dipterocarp forest has presently been cleared, especially in Thailand, Laos, and Vietnam. The remaining woodlands consist of a variety of types of habitats and consequently a wide range of trees and undergrowth plants.

== Fauna ==
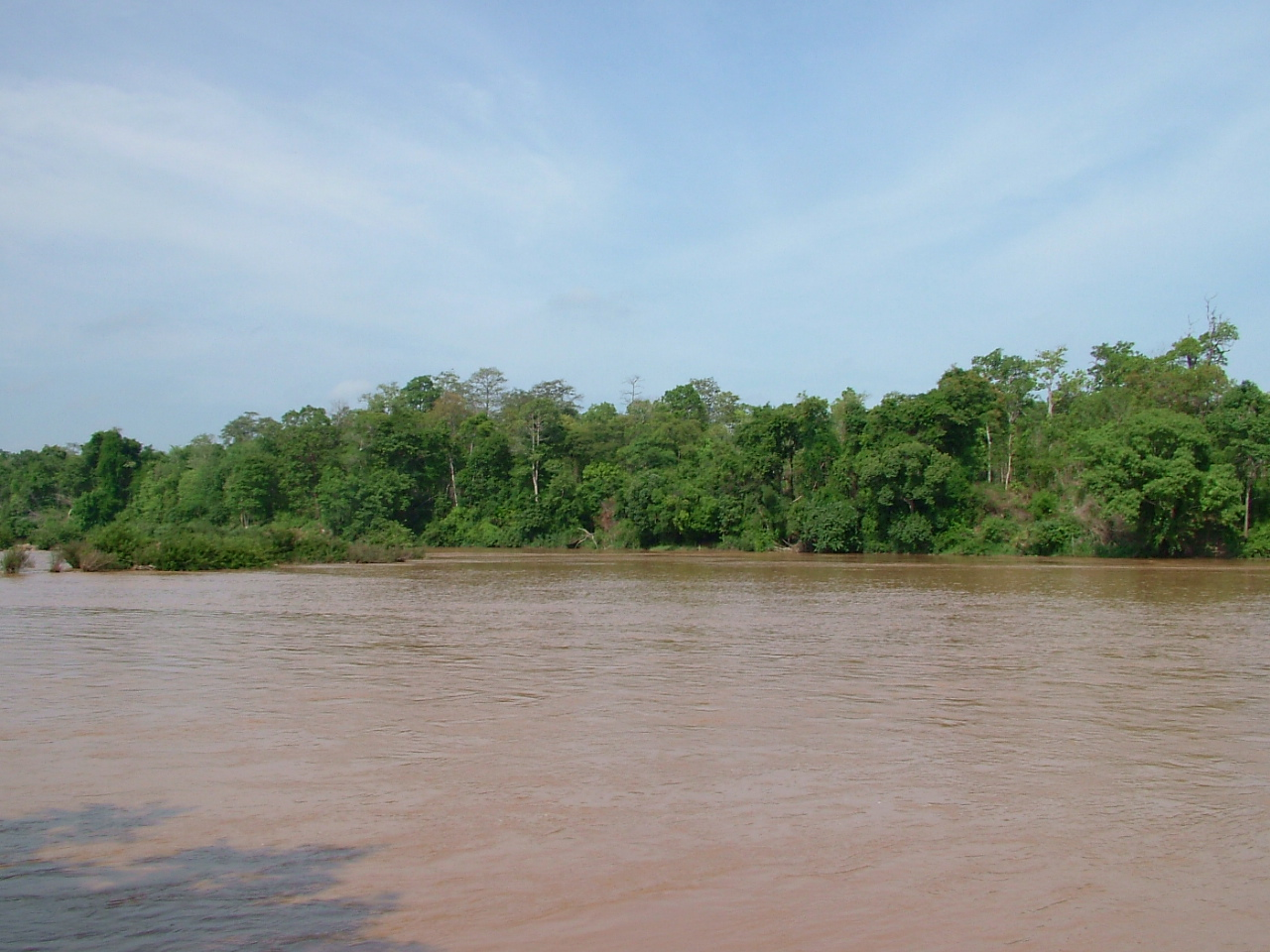
Yok Đôn National Park

The remaining forests are home to some large mammals including Asian elephants (Elephas maximus), wild water buffalo (Bubalus arnee), Eld's deer (Cervus eldii) and three species of wild cattle the gaur (Bos gaurus), the banteng (Bos javanicus) and the kouprey (Bos sauveli). Large herds of these grazing animals were once widespread across the region and were preyed upon by tigers (Panthera tigris), clouded leopard (Felis nebulosa), leopards (Panthera pardus) and dhole (wild dogs) (Cuon alpinus). Both loss of habitat and hunting have seriously reduced numbers of all these animals many of which are endangered with the kouprey very rare and other species such as the Javan rhinoceros (Rhinoceros sondaicus), Sumatran rhinoceros (Dicerorhinus sumatrensis) and Schomburgk's deer (Cervus duvaucelli schomburgki) now extinct in the region.

Other mammals of the region include the pileated gibbon, two leaf monkeys (the silvery lutung and Phayre's leaf monkey), and the sun bear while there are two endemic species, both are vesper bats - the Szechwan myotis (Myotis altarium) and the Chinese pipistrelle (Pipistrellus pulveratus).

There are 500 species of bird in the region including the critically endangered and possibly extinct white-eyed river martin (Pseudochelidon sirintarae), the endemic grey-faced tit-babbler (Macronous kelleyi) and the endangered or threatened Bengal florican (Eupodotis bengalensis), greater adjutant (Leptoptilos dubius) and white-shouldered ibis (Pseudibis davisoni). Other birds of the remaining woodlands of the area include the silver pheasant (Lophura nycthemera), Siamese fireback (Lophura diardi), Mrs. Hume's pheasant (Syrmaticus humiae), grey peacock-pheasant (Polyplectron bicalcaratum), sarus crane (Grus antigone), great hornbill (Buceros bicornis), Austen's brown hornbill (Anorrhinus austeni), and wreathed hornbill (Aceros undulatus).

The reptile and amphibian populations require further study but most likely include endemic species such as a critically endangered Cantor's giant soft-shelled turtle (Pelochelys cantorii), two geckos (the dtella, Gehyra lacerata and the sandstone gecko, Gekko petricolus) and the Korat supple skink (Lygosoma koratense).

== Threats and preservation ==
Active preservation is required to keep large tracts of the remaining habitat intact and connected rather than being broken into small patches. This is particularly important for the survival of the remaining tiger populations in the wild. About 6% of the area is protected with the largest areas including Kulen Promtep Wildlife Sanctuary, Lomphat Wildlife Sanctuary and Phnom Prich in Cambodia and Xe Piane National Biodiversity Conservation Area in Laos.

== See also ==
- List of trees of northern Thailand
