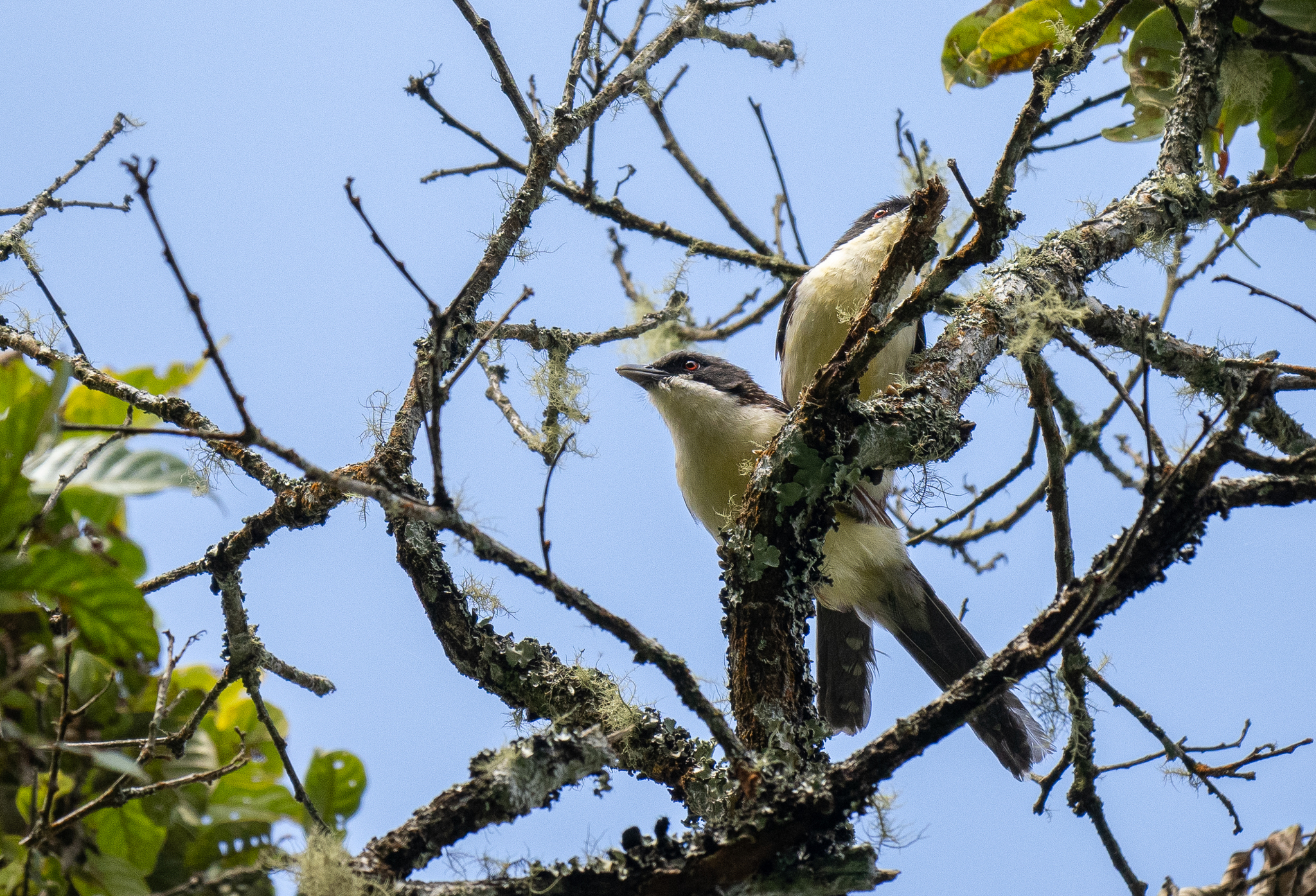

Conservation status
- Near Threatened (IUCN 3.1)

Scientific classification
- Kingdom: Animalia
- Phylum: Chordata
- Class: Aves
- Order: Passeriformes
- Family: Leiothrichidae
- Genus: Laniellus
- Species: L. albonotatus

Binomial name
- Laniellus albonotatus (Lesson, 1831)

Synonyms
- Crocias albonotatus

= Spotted crocias =

Species of bird

The spotted crocias (Laniellus albonotatus) is a passerine bird in the family Leiothrichidae. It is endemic to the island of Java in Indonesia, where it is confined to west Java.

This species was formerly placed in the genus Crocias but under the rules of the International Code of Zoological Nomenclature Laniellus Swainson, 1832 has priority over Crocias Temminck, 1836.

Its natural habitat is subtropical or tropical moist montane forests. It is threatened by habitat loss.
