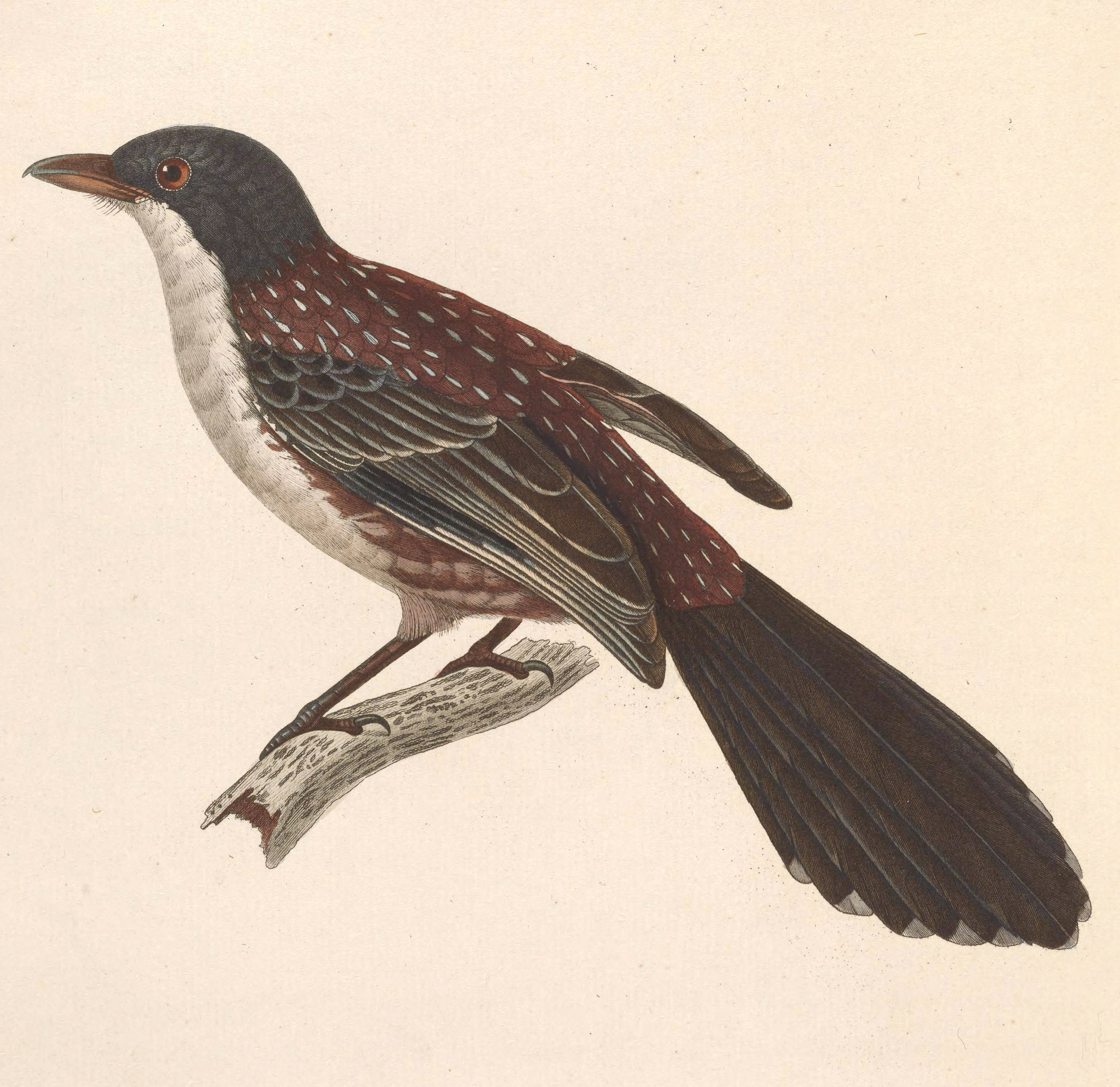
- Spotted crocias Laniellus albonotatus

Scientific classification
- Kingdom: Animalia
- Phylum: Chordata
- Class: Aves
- Order: Passeriformes
- Family: Leiothrichidae
- Genus: Laniellus; Swainson, 1832

Type species
- Lanius leucogrammicus

Species
- See text

= Laniellus =

Genus of birds

Laniellus is a genus of passerine birds in the family Leiothrichidae.

== Taxonomy ==
These species were both formerly placed in the genus Crocias but under the rules of the International Code of Zoological Nomenclature Laniellus Swainson, 1832 has priority over Crocias Temminck, 1836. The type species is the spotted crocias.

=== Species ===
The genus contains the following two species:

Image	Common name	Scientific name
	Spotted crocias	Laniellus albonotatus
	Grey-crowned crocias	Laniellus langbianis
