= Côn Đảo National Park =

National park in Vietnam

Con Dao National Park
- IUCN category II (national park)
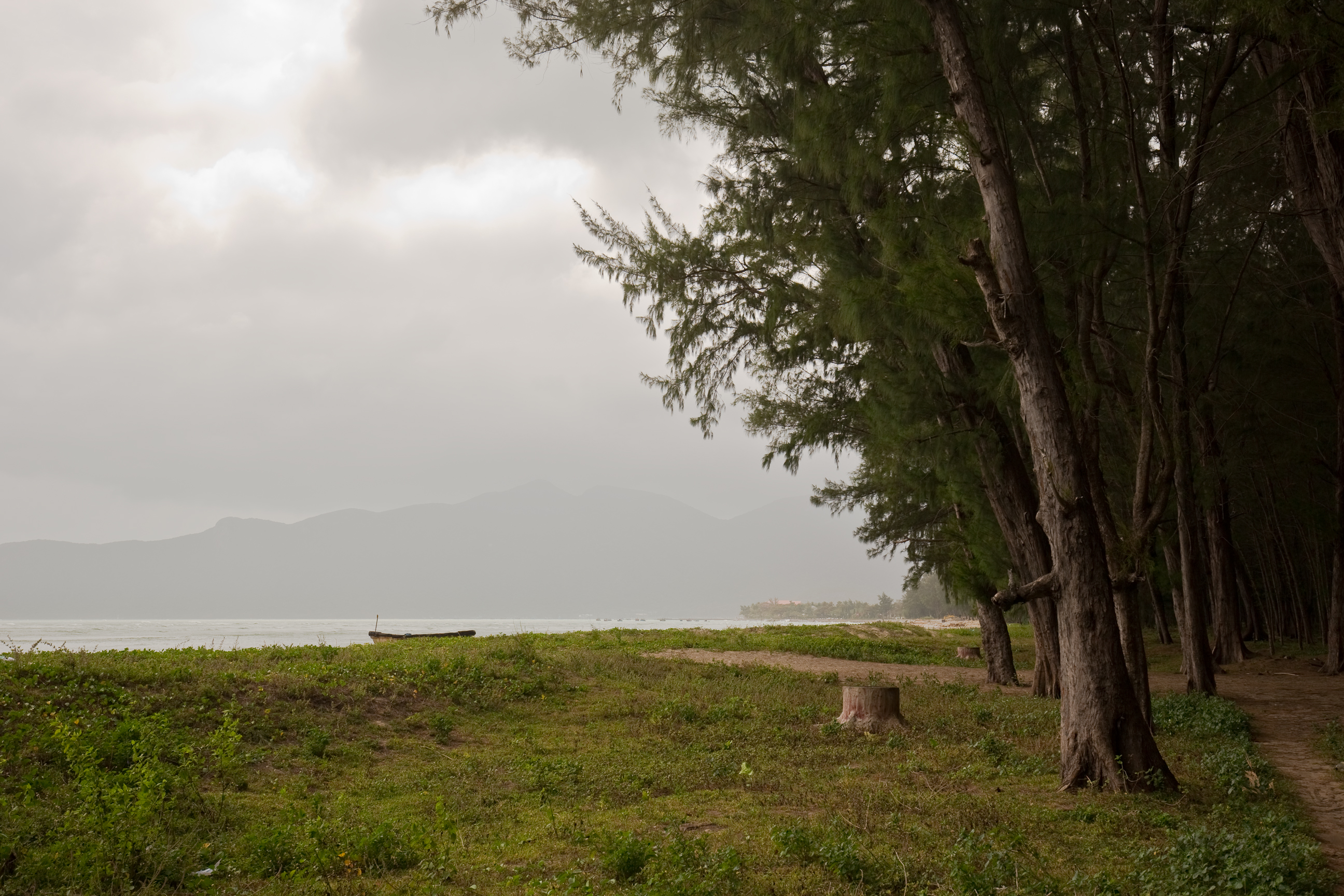

- Location within Vietnam
- Location: South Vietnam
- Nearest city: Cần Thơ
- Coordinates: 8°41′30″N 106°38′00″E
- Area: 15,043 km^{2} (5,808 sq mi)
- Established: 1993
- Governing body: People's Committee of Ho Chi Minh City

Ramsar Wetland
- Official name: Con Dao National Park
- Designated: 18 June 2013
- Reference no.: 2203

Côn Đảo National Park (Vietnamese: Vườn quốc gia Côn Đảo) is a natural reserve area on Côn Đảo Island, in Ho Chi Minh City in coastal southeastern Vietnam. The park includes a part of the island and the surrounding sea. The national park is characterized by a diverse ecosystem. Many species of corals as well as sea turtles, dolphins, and endangered dugongs are found here. In 2006, a delegation of UNESCO Vietnam representatives surveyed the area and concluded that the park is eligible to be a natural-cultural mixture World Heritage. The Vietnamese government is preparing necessary documents to submit to UNESCO soon. A controversial paved road project had been proposed by the local government but was finally rejected by the national government following protests from environmental activists. In 2017 work on the road began and it is still under construction (02/2018).

== See also ==
- Protected areas of Vietnam
