= Indo-Burma =

Biodiversity hotspot

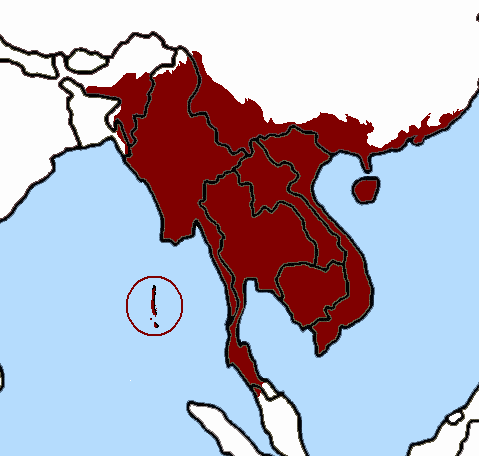

Indo-Burma is a biodiversity hotspot designated by Conservation International.

== Geography ==
Indo-Burma encompasses 2,373,000 square kilometres (916,000 sq mi) of tropical Asia, east of the Ganges-Brahmaputra lowlands. Formerly including the Himalaya chain and the associated foothills in Nepal, Bhutan, and India, Indo-Burma has now been more narrowly redefined as the Indo-Chinese subregion. The area contains the Lower Mekong catchment. It begins in eastern Bangladesh and then extends across north-eastern India, south of the Brahmaputra River, to encompass nearly all of Myanmar, part of southern and western Yunnan Province in China, all of the Lao People’s Democratic Republic, Cambodia and Vietnam, the vast majority of Thailand and a small part of Peninsular Malaysia. In addition, the hotspot covers the coastal lowlands of southern China (in southern Guangxi and Guangdong), as well as several offshore islands, such as Hainan Island (of China) in the South China Sea and the Andaman Islands (of India) in the Andaman Sea. The hotspot contains the Lower Mekong catchment.

The hotspot encompasses 33 terrestrial ecoregions, which include tropical and subtropical moist broadleaf forests, tropical and subtropical dry broadleaf forests, tropical and subtropical coniferous forests, temperate broadleaf and mixed forests, and mangroves.

The transition to the Sundaland Hotspot in the south occurs on the Thai-Malay Peninsula, the boundary between the two hotspots is represented by the Kangar-Pattani Line, which cuts across the Thailand-Malaysia border, though some analyses indicate that the phytogeographical and zoogeographical transition between the Sundaland and Indo-Burma biotas may lie just to the north of the Isthmus of Kra, associated with a gradual change from wet seasonal evergreen dipterocarp rainforest to mixed moist deciduous forest.

Much of Indo-Burma is characterized by distinct seasonal weather patterns. During the northern winter months, dry, cool winds blow from the stable continental Asian high-pressure system, resulting in a dry period under clear skies across much of the south, center, and west of the hotspot (the dry, northeast monsoon). As the continental system weakens in spring, the wind direction reverses and air masses forming the southwest monsoon picks up moisture from the seas to the southwest and bring abundant rains as they rise over the hills and mountains.

A wide diversity of ecosystems is represented in this hotspot, including mixed wet evergreen, dry evergreen, deciduous, and montane forests. There are also patches of shrublands and woodlands on karst limestone outcrops and, in some coastal areas, scattered heath forests. In addition, a wide variety of distinctive, localized vegetation formations occur in Indo-Burma, including lowland floodplain swamps, mangroves, and seasonally inundated grasslands.

The area includes portions of eastern India (including the Andaman and Nicobar Islands), eastern Bangladesh (Chittagong Hill Tracts), southernmost China, most of Myanmar (excluding the northern tip), most of Thailand (excluding the southern tip), and all of Cambodia, Laos, and Vietnam.

=== Fauna ===
Six large mammal species have been discovered since the 1990s: the large-antlered muntjac, the Annamite muntjac, the grey-shanked douc, the Annamite striped rabbit, the leaf deer, and the saola.

Ten species of the Indo-Burma are threatened: saola, Eld's deer, Cat Ba langur, fishing cat, giant ibis, Mekong giant catfish, spoon-billed sandpiper, red-headed vulture and white-rumped vulture, sarus crane and the Irrawaddy dolphin.

== Threats to the environment ==
The Indo-Burma Hotspot is one of the environments on planet Earth under the highest threat of destruction. As the hotspot also is home to endangered species found nowhere else.

=== Human impacts ===
Indo-Burma was one of the first places where humans developed agriculture, and has a history of using fire to clear land for agriculture and other needs. The need for agricultural products has increased in recent years, with the expansion of both human populations and markets. This has contributed to widespread forest destruction; tree plantations (teak, rubber, oil palm) have replaced large areas of lowland forest, while coffee, tea, vegetable crops and sugarcane plantations threaten montane and hill forests. Other threats to forests include logging, mining for gems and ore, firewood collection, and charcoal production.

Aquatic ecosystems are also under intense development pressure in many areas. Freshwater floodplain swamps and wetlands are destroyed by draining for wet rice cultivation, particularly in Thailand, Myanmar and Vietnam. Rivers have been dammed in order to store water to generate electricity for countries’ economic growth, or for export to neighboring countries to generate foreign exchange earnings. Damming a river section transforms that section into a large pond, reduces the temperature and oxygen content, and increases river-bed erosion and water turbidity downriver.

Reservoir operation procedures result in occasional or regular flooding of sandbars, sandbanks, stretches of channel mosaic, and other habitats that would normally be exposed during the dry season, with impacts on nesting bird and turtle species.

Mangroves have been converted to small shrimp aqua-cultural ponds, while intertidal mudflats have been afforested with mangrove or intensely fished by lines of stack nets, which severely impacts their value as feeding habitat for migratory waterbirds and other species. Moreover, sand dune ecosystems are severely threatened by afforestation, for instance, with the Australian exotic Casuarina equisetifolia. Overfishing and the increasing use of destructive fishing techniques diminishes the fish population in both coastal and offshore marine ecosystems.

The area also holds endemism in freshwater turtle species, most of which are threatened with extinction, due to over-harvesting and extensive habitat loss. Bird life in Indo-Burma is diverse, holding almost 1,300 different bird species, including the threatened white-eared night-heron, the grey-crowned crocias, and the orange-necked partridge.

== Sources ==
- Wikramanayake, E. D.; Dinerstein, E.; Loucks, C. J. (2002). Terrestrial ecoregions of the Indo-Pacific: a conservation assessment. Island Press. ISBN 9781559639231.
