= Chao Phraya lowland moist deciduous forests =

Ecoregion in Central Thailand

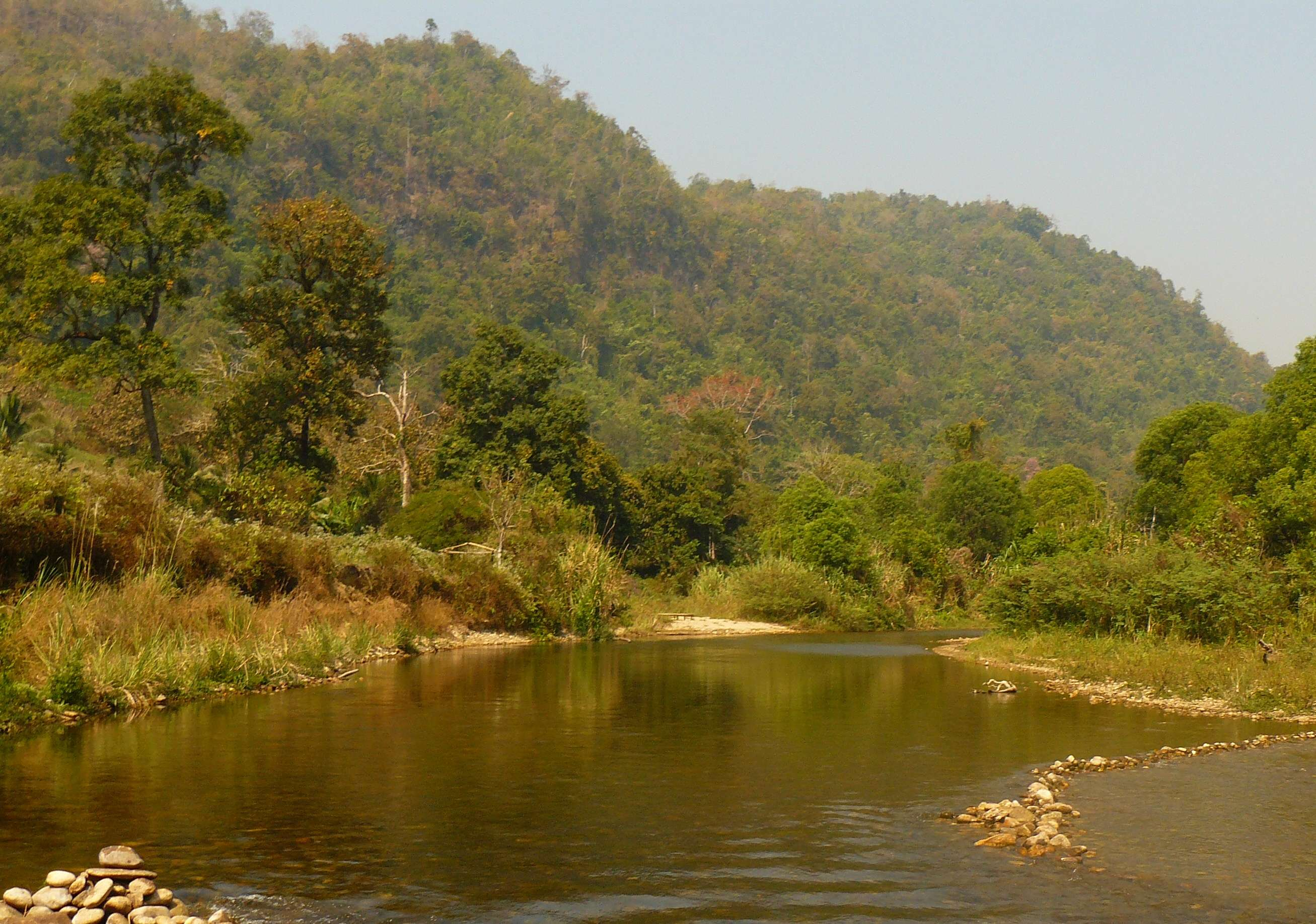
- Ramit River at Thung Yai Naresuan Wildlife Sanctuary

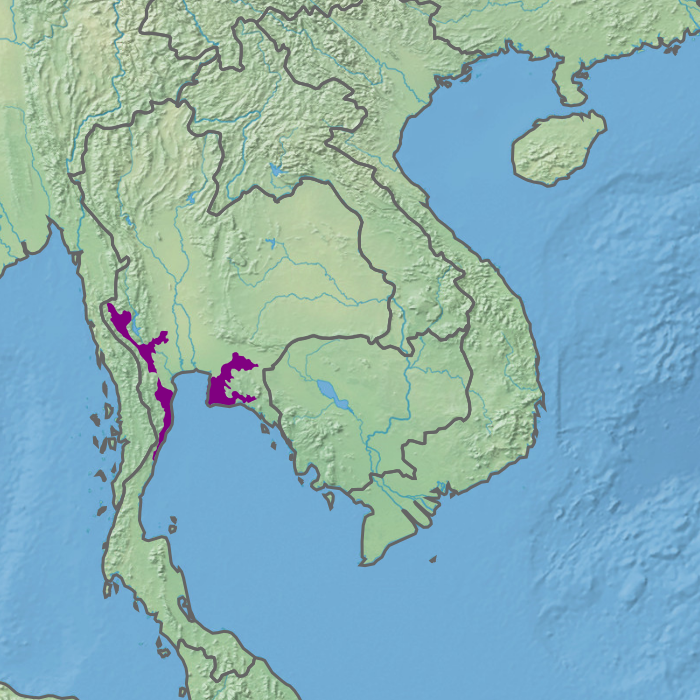
- Ecoregion territory (in purple)

Ecology
- Realm: Indomalayan realm
- Biome: tropical and subtropical moist broadleaf forests
- Borders: List: Cardamom Mountains rain forests; Central Indochina dry forests; Chao Phraya freshwater swamp forests; Indochina mangroves; Kayah–Karen montane rain forests; TenasserimSouth Thailand semi-evergreen rain forests

Geography
- Area: 20,164 km^{2} (7,785 mi^{2})
- Countries: Thailand
- Provinces: List: Chachoengsao; Chanthaburi; Chonburi; Kanchanaburi; Phetchaburi; Prachinburi; Prachuap Khiri Khan; Ratchaburi; Sa Kaeo

Conservation
- Conservation status: Critical/endangered
- Protected: 2,756 km² (14%)

The Chao Phraya lowland moist deciduous forests is a tropical moist broadleaf forest ecoregion in Thailand. The ecoregion occupies the coastal lowlands along the Gulf of Thailand lying east and west of the Chao Phraya River.

== Geography ==
The Chao Phraya lowlands moist deciduous forests occupy two separate areas along the Gulf of Thailand. The western and larger portion lies between the Dawna Range and Tenasserim Hills on the west and the lower Chao Phraya River to the east. The ecoregion extends to the northwest along the valley of the Khwae Noi River, which separates the Dawna Range from the Bilauktaung sub-range of the Tenasserim Hills.

The eastern portion lies west of the Cardamom Mountains in eastern Thailand and Cambodia. The Chao Phraya lowlands that separate them are part of the Chao Phraya freshwater swamp forests ecoregion, although the swamp forests have mostly been converted to rice paddies and farm fields. Both the eastern and western portions are bounded on the north by the Central Indochina dry forests ecoregion.

== Climate ==
The climate is tropical, and rainfall totals 1,000–1,100 mm annually in the west, and 1,300 mm or more in the east. Rainfall is strongly seasonal; 80% of the annual rainfall is during the May-to-October southwest monsoon.

== Flora ==
The forests are characterized by dry-season-deciduous dipterocarps, Cinnamomum cassia, Durio zibethinus, Garcinia mangostana, Artocarpus heterophyllus, Ficus benghalensis, Gnetum gnemon, Mangifera indica, Toona ciliata, Toona sinensis, Cocos nucifera, Tetrameles nudiflora, Ginkgo biloba, Shorea robusta, Prunus serrulata, Camphora officinarum, Tsuga dumosa, Ulmus lanceifolia, Tectona grandis, Terminalia elliptica, Terminalia bellirica, and Quercus acutissima trees. Much of the forest has been cleared, and much of what remains has been degraded or reduced to small patches.

== Fauna ==
Many rare and endangered species live in this ecoregion, which is incredibly biodiverse. Species include mammals such as the banteng, reptiles such as the nearly extinct Siamese crocodile, and birds like the Indochinese magpie, Siamese fireback, green imperial pigeon, and scary-crowned babbler.

== Protected areas ==
A 2017 assessment found that 2,756 km^{2}, or 14%, of the ecoregion is in protected areas. Protected areas include Khao Laem National Park and Sai Yok National Park in the Khwae Noi River valley.
