= Szechwan myotis =

Conservation status
- Least Concern (IUCN 3.1)

Scientific classification
- Kingdom: Animalia
- Phylum: Chordata
- Class: Mammalia
- Order: Chiroptera
- Family: Vespertilionidae
- Genus: Myotis
- Species: M. altarium

Binomial name
- Myotis altarium Thomas, 1911
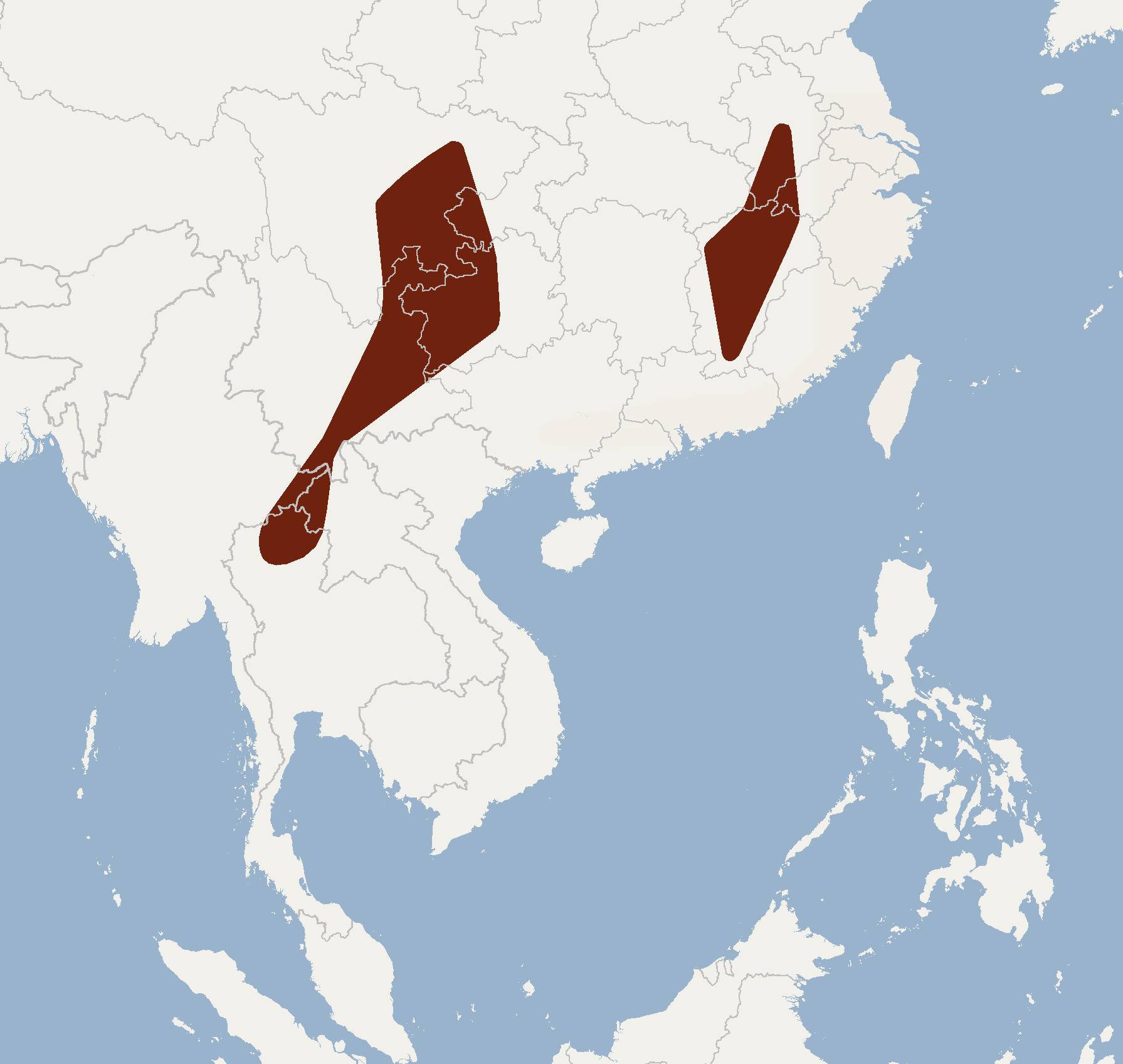

Species of bat

The Szechwan myotis (Myotis altarium) is a species of vesper bat. It is found in China and Thailand.
