= Phú Quốc National Park =

National park in Vietnam

Phu Quoc National Park
- IUCN category II (national park)
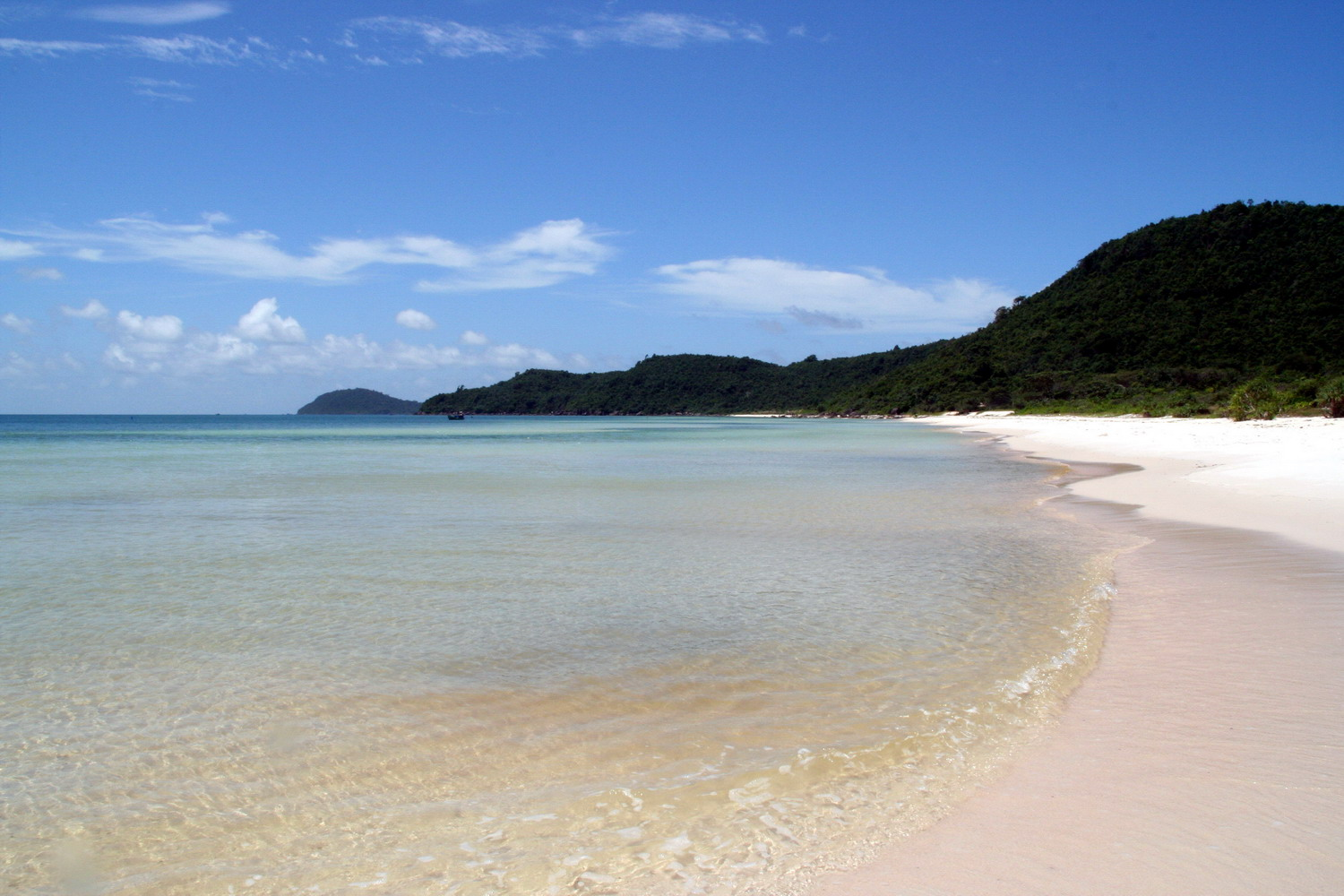
- Beach at Phú Quốc National Park

- Location within Vietnam
- Location: Mekong Delta
- Nearest city: Cần Thơ
- Coordinates: 10°19′30″N 103°57′00″E
- Area: 314.22 km^{2} (121.32 sq mi)
- Established: 2001
- Governing body: People's Committee of An Giang Province

Phú Quốc National Park (Vietnamese: Vườn quốc gia Phú Quốc) is a national park on Phú Quốc Island, in the An Giang Province of Vietnam's Mekong Delta Region. The park covers approximately 70% of the island. This park includes land and sea area, protecting oceanic species such as dugong. This park was established by the Decision 91/2001/QĐ-TTg dated 8 June 2001 signed by the Prime Minister of Vietnam on upgrading Northern Phú Quốc Islands Preservation Zone to Phu Quoc National Park.

== Location ==
Phu Quoc National Park includes Northern Phú Quốc Islands Preservation Zone, Ham Rong Mount, Ganh Dau and Cua Can. The park is situated within the boundaries of Phú Quốc special administrative zone, An Giang Province.

== Areas ==
The park covers 31,422 ha, comprising 8,603 ha strictly protected area, 22,603 ha biological restoration area, and 33 ha for administration and service.
