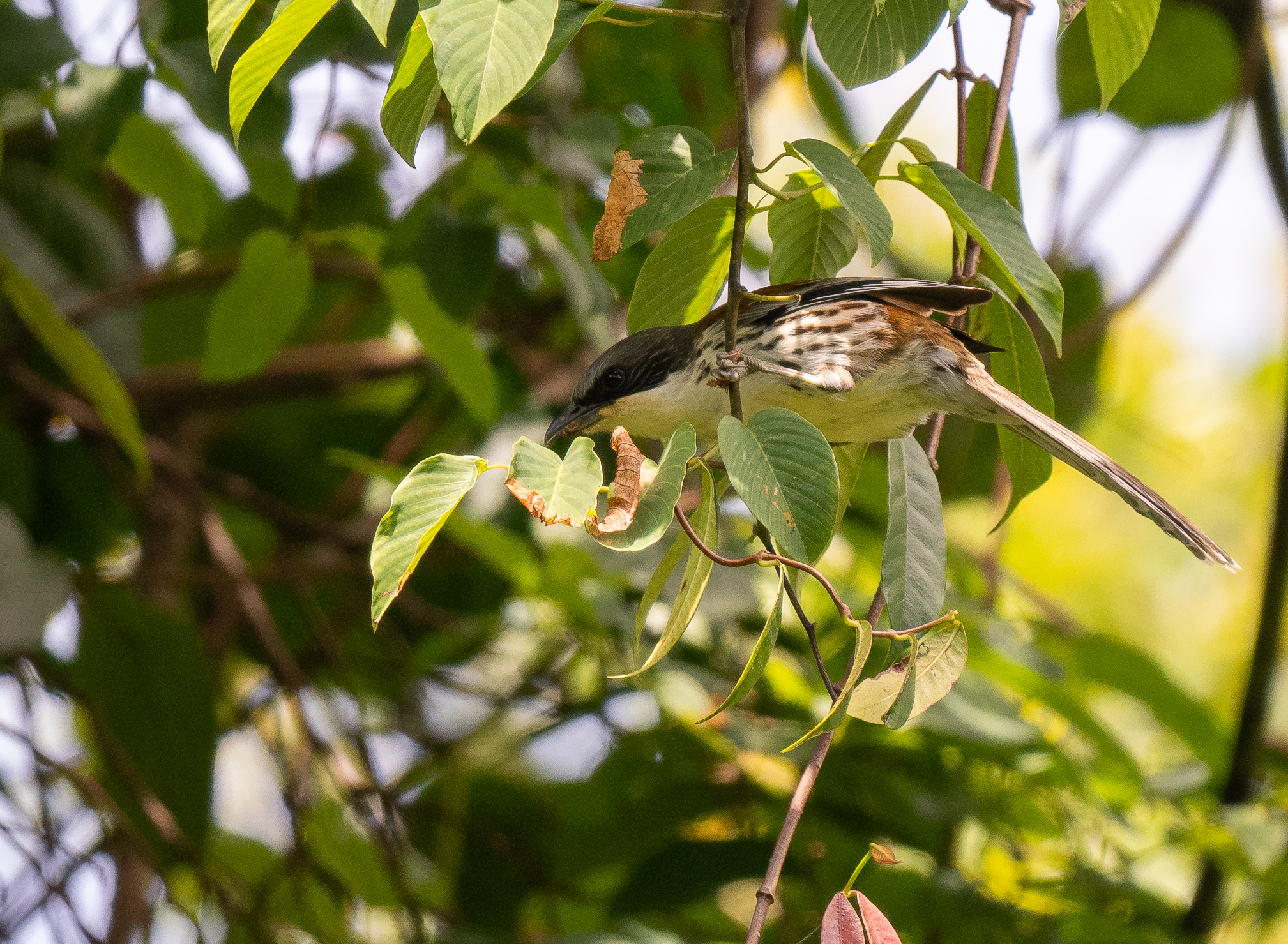

Conservation status
- Endangered (IUCN 3.1)

Scientific classification
- Kingdom: Animalia
- Phylum: Chordata
- Class: Aves
- Order: Passeriformes
- Family: Leiothrichidae
- Genus: Laniellus
- Species: L. langbianis

Binomial name
- Laniellus langbianis (Gyldenstolpe, 1939)

= Grey-crowned crocias =

Species of bird

The grey-crowned crocias (Laniellus langbianis) is a passerine bird in the family Leiothrichidae. It is endemic to Vietnam, where it has a highly restricted distribution in the Da Lat Plateau. It has also been observed, and independently surveyed in 2015, in Central Vietnam on the Kontum Plateau, where it may be more abundant. Its natural habitat is intact broadleaf evergreen forest and secondary forest, generally near watercourses, between 910–1450 m above sea-level.

This species was formerly placed in the genus Crocias but under the rules of the International Code of Zoological Nomenclature Laniellus Swainson, 1832 has priority over Crocias Temminck, 1836.

It is threatened by habitat loss, although the species is elusive and easily overlooked, so much so that it was previously considered critically endangered.
