= Chao Phraya freshwater swamp forests =

Ecoregion in Central Thailand

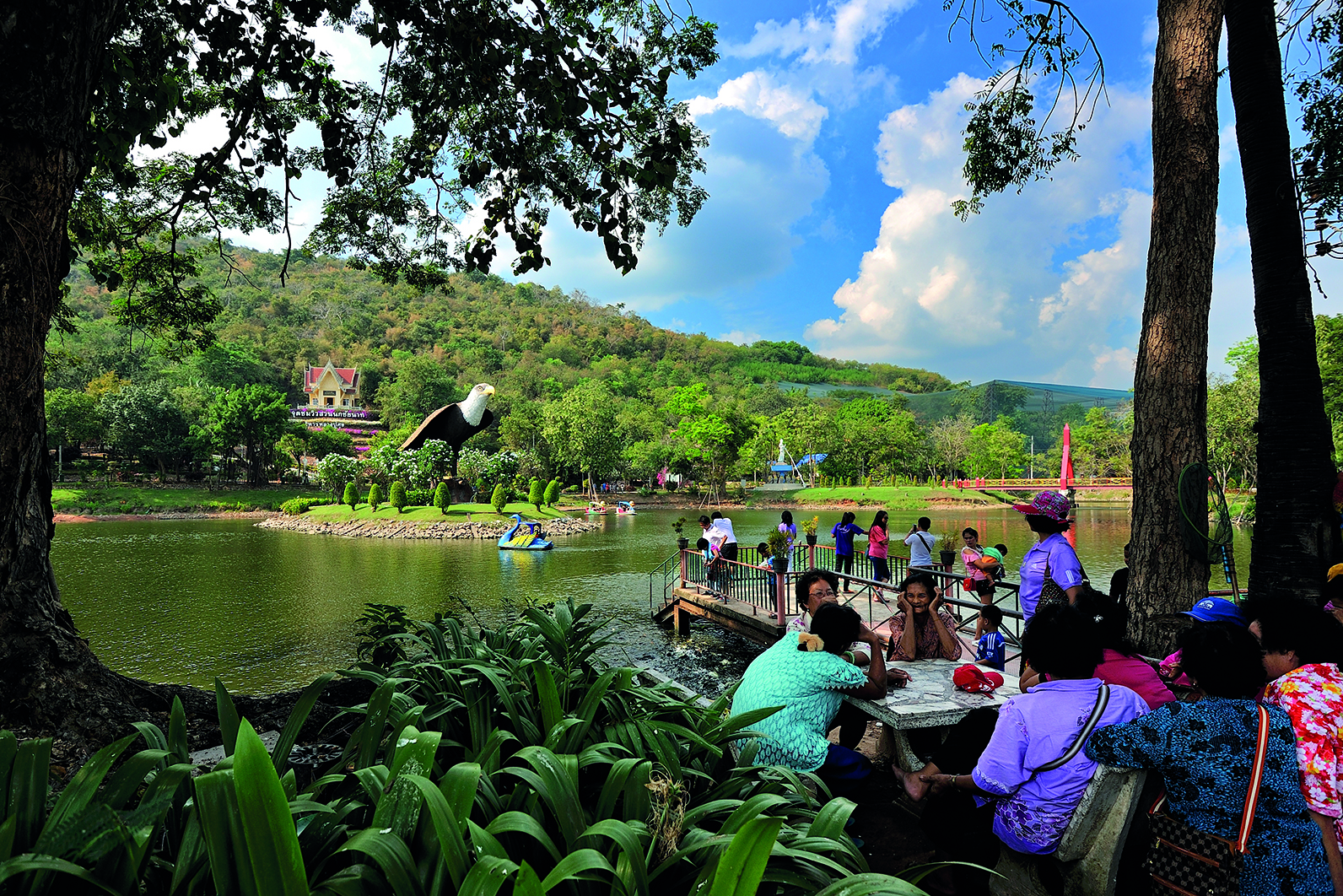
- Chai Nat Bird Park, Thailand

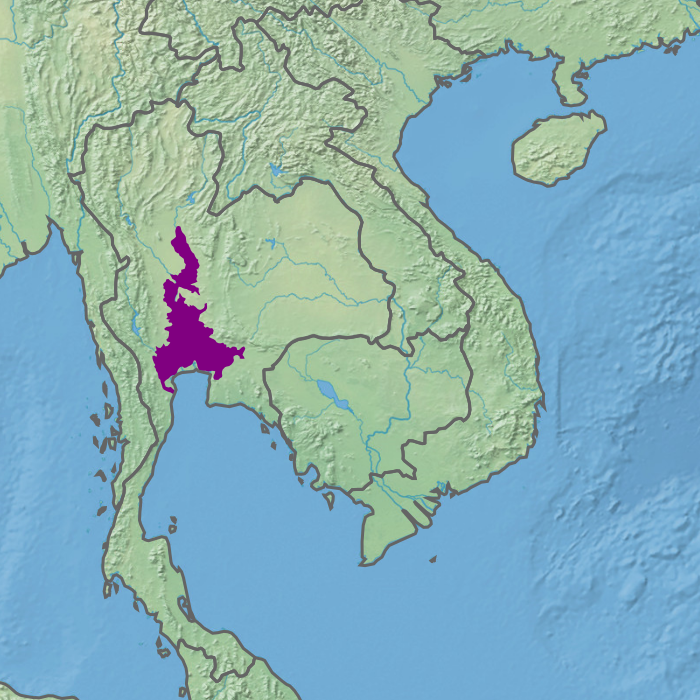
- Location of the ecoregion

Ecology
- Realm: Indomalayan
- Biome: tropical and subtropical moist broadleaf forests

Geography
- Area: 38,858 km^{2} (15,003 sq mi)
- Country: Thailand

Conservation
- Conservation status: Critical/endangered
- Protected: 290 km² (1%)

The Chao Phraya freshwater swamp forests is a tropical and subtropical moist broadleaf forests ecoregion in Thailand. It occupies the lowlands of the Chao Phraya River watershed in central Thailand. The ecoregion was once home to extensive swamp forests and wetlands. The ecoregion has mostly been converted to agriculture and cities, and very little natural forest remains. The ecoregion's rice paddies and waterways still sustain some wildlife.

== Geography ==
The ecoregion has an area of 38,858 km^{2}. It extends about 400 km (249 mi) north to south and 180 km (112 mi) east to west.

The original swamp forests have almost entirely been removed as the plain has been converted to rice paddies, other agriculture, and urban areas like Bangkok.

== Flora ==
Today we can only guess at the original habitat and wildlife by comparing it with neighbouring countries. It is believed that the area would have consisted of freshwater swamps inland (which consist of Cinnamomum cassia, Durio zibethinus, Garcinia mangostana, Artocarpus heterophyllus, Ficus benghalensis, Gnetum gnemon, Mangifera indica, Toona ciliata, Toona sinensis, Cocos nucifera, Tetrameles nudiflora, Ginkgo biloba, Shorea robusta, Prunus serrulata, Camphora officinarum, Tsuga dumosa, Ulmus lanceifolia, Tectona grandis, Terminalia elliptica, Terminalia bellirica, Quercus acutissima, and dipterocarps) and salty Avicennia-Rhizophora-Sonneratia-Nypa fruticans mangroves on the coast and the river estuaries. The swamp would have been covered in Phragmites marsh grasses. Today there is a small area of this remaining in Khao Sam Roi Yot National Park, a relic of the original landscape.

== Fauna ==
Much of the wildlife that once inhabited these plains has disappeared, including a large number of fish in the river systems, birds such as vultures, the Oriental darter (Anhinga melanogaster), white-eyed river martin (Pseudochelidon sirintarae), the sarus crane (Grus antigone) and mammals such as tigers, Asian elephants, and Javan rhinoceroses. Schomburgk's deer (Rucervus schomburgki), which was endemic to the ecoregion, is believed to be extinct.

There are populations of threatened birds, including colonies of breeding water birds such as the world's largest populations of the near-threatened Asian openbill (Anastomus oscitans), and other birds such as the wintering black kite (Milvus migrans). Endemic mammals that remain are the limestone rat (Niviventer hinpoon), Neill's long-tailed giant rat (Leopoldamys neilli), and the near-endemic Thailand roundleaf bat (Hipposideros halophyllus).

The Chao Phraya basin is home to about half a dozen endemic dragonflies and damselflies. The conservation status of most of these in unclear (they are rated as data deficient by the IUCN), but Cryptophaea saukra is critically endangered and Caliphaea angka is endangered.

== Conservation and threats ==
As so much has been cleared or altered the potential for creating large protected areas to preserve original habitat no longer exists. However much wildlife does remain in the rice fields and steps may be taken to preserve these as urban and industrial development on the plains is ongoing and the Industrial Estate Authority of Thailand has very little control or planning over this. Particular threats come from the conversion of rice paddies to large-scale production of prawns by pumping in seawater, and the use of pesticides to eliminate the introduced snail,Pomacea canaliculata, which damages rice plants.

== Protected areas ==
A 2017 assessment found that 290 km², or less than 1%, of the ecoregion is in protected areas.
