= Eastern Himalayan broadleaf forests =

Temperate broadleaf forest ecoregion

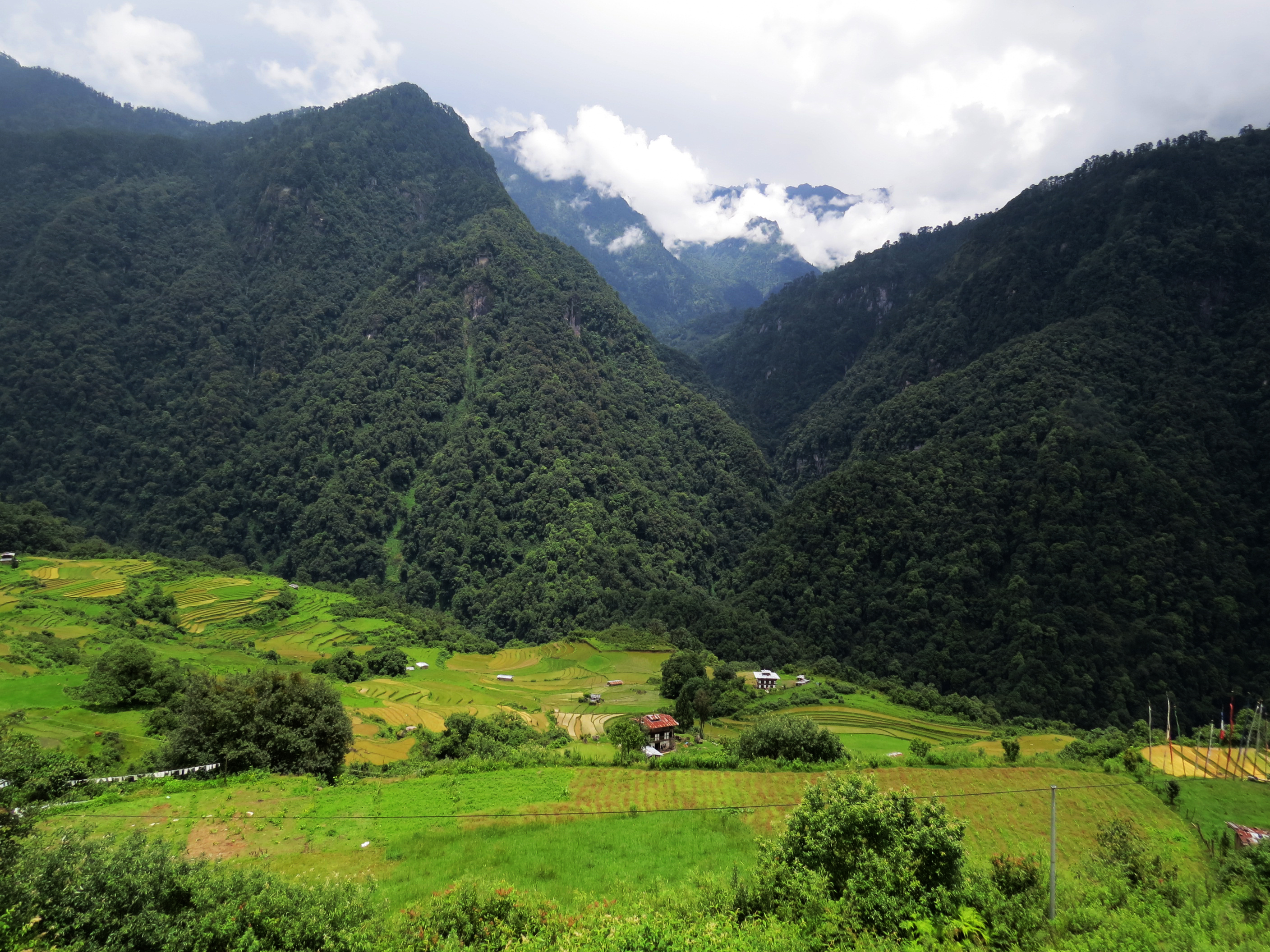
- Broadleaf forests in Jigme Dorji National Park, Bhutan

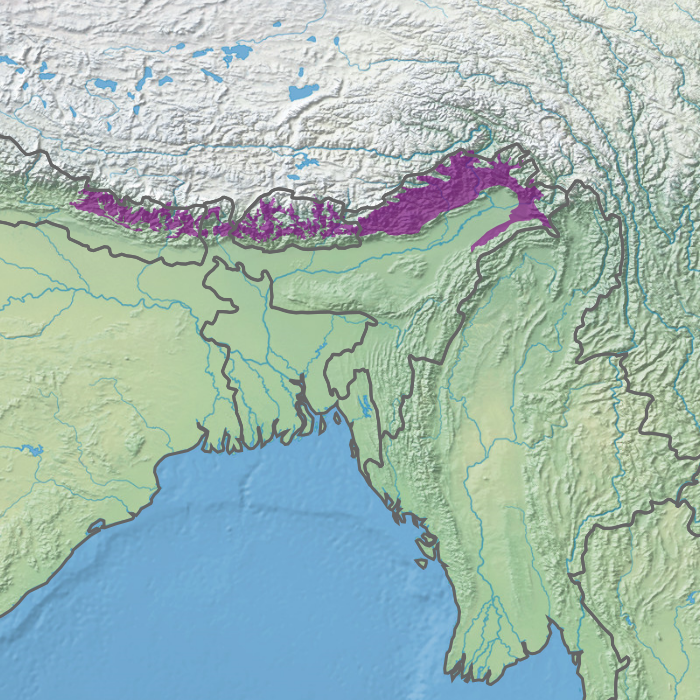
- Ecoregion territory (in purple)

Ecology
- Realm: Indomalayan
- Biome: temperate broadleaf and mixed forests
- Borders: List: Eastern Himalayan subalpine conifer forests; Northeastern Himalayan subalpine conifer forests; Northern Triangle temperate forests; Mizoram–Manipur–Kachin rain forests; Northeast India–Myanmar pine forests; Brahmaputra Valley semi-evergreen forests; Himalayan subtropical broadleaf forests; Himalayan subtropical pine forests
- Bird species: 490
- Mammal species: 183

Geography
- Area: 83,100 km^{2} (32,100 mi^{2})
- Countries: List: Bhutan; India; Nepal; Myanmar; China

Conservation
- Habitat loss: 20.809%
- Protected: 8.97%

The Eastern Himalayan broadleaf forests is a temperate broadleaf forest ecoregion found in the middle elevations of the eastern Himalayas, including parts of Nepal, India, Bhutan, Myanmar and China. These forests have an outstanding richness of wildlife.

== Setting ==
This ecoregion covers an area of 83,100 km^{2} (32,100 mi^{2}) and constitutes a band of temperate broadleaf forests lying on steep mountain slopes of the Himalayas between approximately 2,000 and 3,000 m (6,600 and 9,800 ft). It extends from the Kali Gandaki River in Nepal across Sikkim and West Bengal in India, Bhutan, the Indian state of Arunachal Pradesh and neighboring Myanmar. China's Chayu Nature Reserve also has a very small part of this ecoregion.

The temperate broadleaf forests transition into the Himalayan subtropical pine forests and the Himalayan subtropical broadleaf forests at lower elevations, and into the Eastern Himalayan subalpine conifer forests at higher elevations. This area receives over 2000 mm of rainfall per year, mostly falling from May to September during the monsoon.

== Flora ==
The Eastern Himalayan broadleaf forests are diverse and species-rich, with a good diversity (of oaks and rhododendrons in particular) and many endemic species including plants of Indomalayan, Indochinese, Himalayan, Eastern Asiatic and even Gondwanan origin.

The ecoregion has two broad forest types: evergreen and deciduous. In both types of forests, the dominant trees are Pinus roxburghii, Pinus hwangshanensis, Juniperus tibetica, Shorea robusta, Olea europaea subsp. cuspidata, and Taxus sumatrana. Evergreen forests are characterized by oaks (Quercus spp.), chiefly Quercus lamellosa, together with Lithocarpus pachyphyllus, Rhododendron arboreum, Rhododendron falconeri, Rhododendron thomsonii, Magnolia doltsopa, Magnolia cathcartii, Exbucklandia populnea, Symplocos cochinchinensis, Taiwania cryptomerioides, Magnolia spp., Cinnamomum spp., and Machilus spp. The many rhododendron species include more than fifty in Sikkim and another sixty in Bhutan.

In the deciduous forests meanwhile the predominant tree species are Himalayan maple (Acer campbellii), Juglans regia, Alnus nepalensis, Betula alnoides, Betula utilis, Larix griffithii, Tsuga dumosa, Picea brachytyla, and Echinocarpus dasycarpus.

Finally in Eastern Nepal there are wetter areas dominated by a mixture of Magnolia campbellii, Acer campbellii and Osmanthus suavis along with Himalayan hazel (Corylus ferox).

== Fauna ==
The forests are home to over 500 species of bird some of which migrate to the higher Himalayas in the hot summer. There are twelve near-endemic bird species as well as the strictly endemic rufous-throated wren-babbler. A number of bird species especially pheasant, tragopan and hornbill are easily threatened by changes to their habitat and those found here include the globally threatened rufous-necked hornbill (Aceros nipalensis), Sclater's monal (Lophophorus sclateri), white-bellied heron (Ardea insignis), Blyth's tragopan (Tragopan blythii) and Ward's trogon (Harpactes wardi).

There are four endemic or near-endemic mammals including Gee's golden langur (Trachypithecus geei) which is found north of the Brahmaputra River between the Sankosh and Manas Rivers. Other endemic mammals are Hodgson's giant flying squirrel (Petaurista magnificus), Namdapha flying squirrel (Biswamoyopterus biswasi) and Brahma white-bellied rat (Niviventer brahma), while endangered species found here include a population of Bengal tigers adapted to higher mountain slopes and having a high conservation priority. Other endangered species include takin (Budorcas taxicolor) and Himalayan serow (a subspecies of Capricornis sumatraensis) as well as the vulnerable Mandelli's mouse-eared bat (Myotis sicarius), Assam macaque (Macaca assamensis), stump-tailed macaque (Macaca arctoides), dhole (Cuon alpinus), back-striped weasel (Mustela strigidorsa), clouded leopard (Neofelis nebulosa), and Irrawaddy squirrel (Callosciurus pygerythrus). The area also includes patches of fir forest with a bamboo undergrowth that are home to the endangered red panda (Ailurus fulgens).

== Conservation ==
Most of the forest is intact as these are steep inaccessible slopes, although the Quercus lanata forests of the lower elevations are vulnerable to clearance, while the upper slopes are liable to be used for livestock grazing, especially in more densely populated Nepal. Protected areas include Namdapha National Park and Mehao Wildlife Sanctuary in Arunachal Pradesh, Makalu Barun National Park in Nepal, and parts of Thrumshingla, Jigme Dorji, and Jigme Singye Wangchuck National Parks and Kulong Chu Wildlife Sanctuary in Bhutan. There are plans to create corridors of protection linking some of these areas in Bhutan and in India. The area around Namdapha National Park has been increasingly settled by Chakma refugees from Bangladesh. Another threat is the plan to build a dam on the Dihing River. One area of importance that is currently unprotected is Mount Phulchowki in the Kathmandu Valley.

=== Protected areas ===
In 1997, 15 protected areas were identified in this ecoregion, with a combined area of approximately 5,800 km^{2} (2,200 sq mi) that includes 7% of the ecoregion's area:

- Eaglenest Wildlife Sanctuary, Arunachal Pradesh (also extends into the Himalayan subtropical pine forests) (120 km^{2} (46 sq mi))
- Mouling National Park, Arunachal Pradesh (also extends into the Himalayan subtropical pine forests) (200 km^{2} (77 sq mi))
- Mehao Wildlife Sanctuary, Arunachal Pradesh (also extends into the Himalayan subtropical pine forests and Brahmaputra Valley semi-evergreen forests) ((110 km^{2} (42 sq mi))
- Royal Manas National Park, Bhutan (also extends into the Himalayan subtropical broadleaf forests) (410 km^{2} (160 sq mi))
- Shivapuri Nagarjun National Park, Nepal (159 km^{2} (61 sq mi))
- Makalu-Barun National Park, Nepal (1,500 km^{2} (580 sq mi)); also extends into the Eastern Himalayan subalpine conifer forests and Eastern Himalayan alpine shrub and meadows
- Neora Valley National Park, West Bengal (88 km^{2} (34 sq mi))
- Torsa Strict Nature Reserve, Bhutan (651 km^{2} (251 sq mi)); also extends into the Eastern Himalayan subalpine conifer forests and Eastern Himalayan alpine shrub and meadows
- Jigme Dorji National Park, Bhutan (also extends into the Eastern Himalayan subalpine conifer forests and Eastern Himalayan alpine shrub and meadows) (560 km^{2} (220 sq mi))
- Thrumshingla National Park, Bhutan (also extends into the Eastern Himalayan alpine shrub and meadows) (310 km^{2} (120 sq mi))
- Bumdeling Wildlife Sanctuary, Bhutan (also extends into the Eastern Himalayan subalpine conifer forests) (390 km^{2} (150 sq mi))
- Jigme Singye Wangchuck National Park, Bhutan (also extends into the Eastern Himalayan subalpine conifer forests and Eastern Himalayan alpine shrub and meadows) (600 km^{2} (230 sq mi))
- Namdapha National Park, Arunachal Pradesh (1,580 km^{2} (610 sq mi))
- Kamlang Wildlife Sanctuary, Arunachal Pradesh (780 km^{2} (300 sq mi))
- Chayu Nature Reserve, Tibet (also extends into the Eastern Himalayan subalpine conifer forests) (320 km^{2} (120 sq mi))

== See also ==
- List of ecoregions in India

Indomalayan temperate broadleaf and mixed forests ecoregions
Eastern Himalayan broadleaf forests	India, Nepal, Bhutan, Myanmar, China
Northern Triangle temperate forests	Myanmar
Western Himalayan broadleaf forests	India, Pakistan, Nepal
