= Himalayan subtropical pine forests =

Ecoregion in Asia

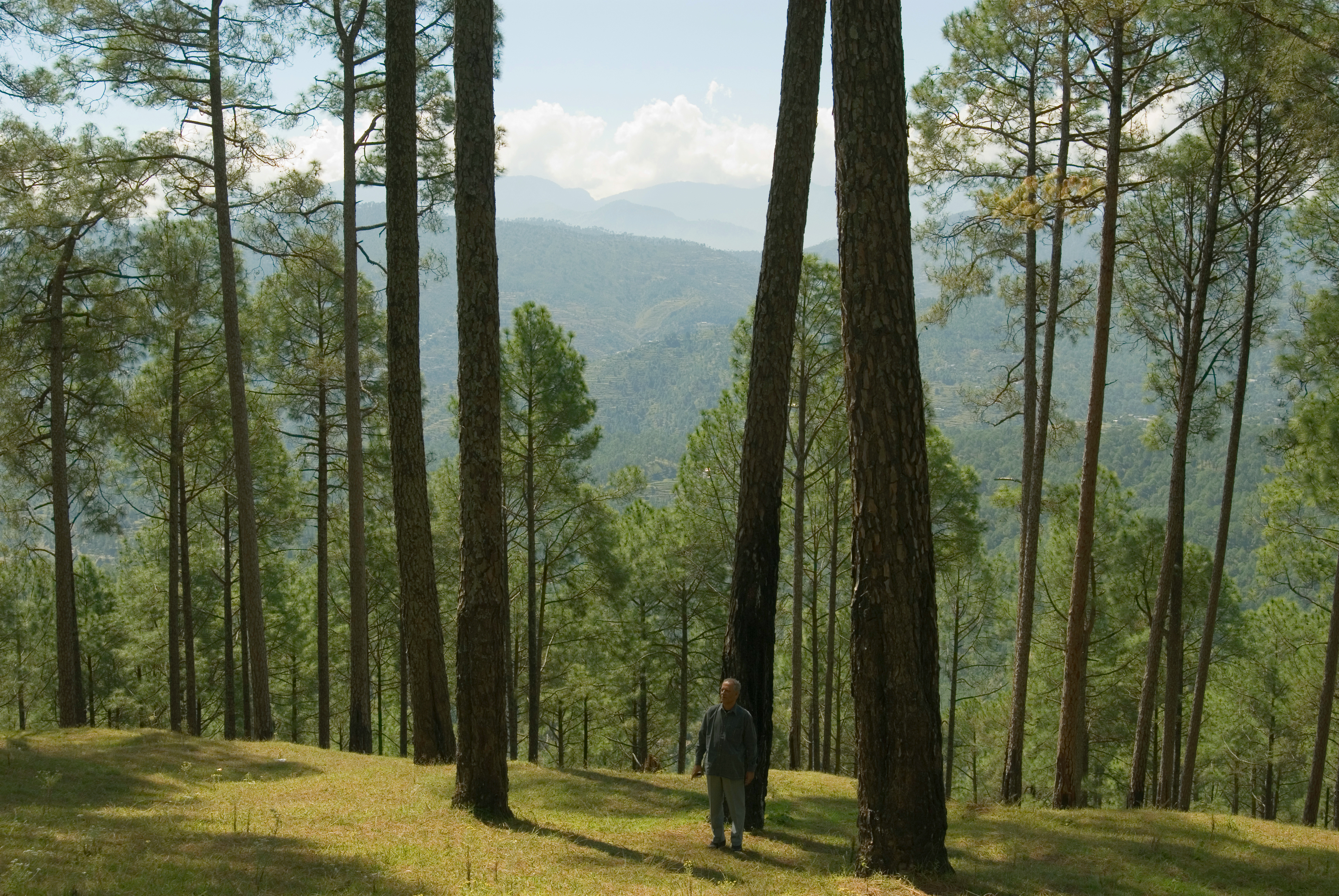
- Pinus roxburghii forest, Uttarakhand, India

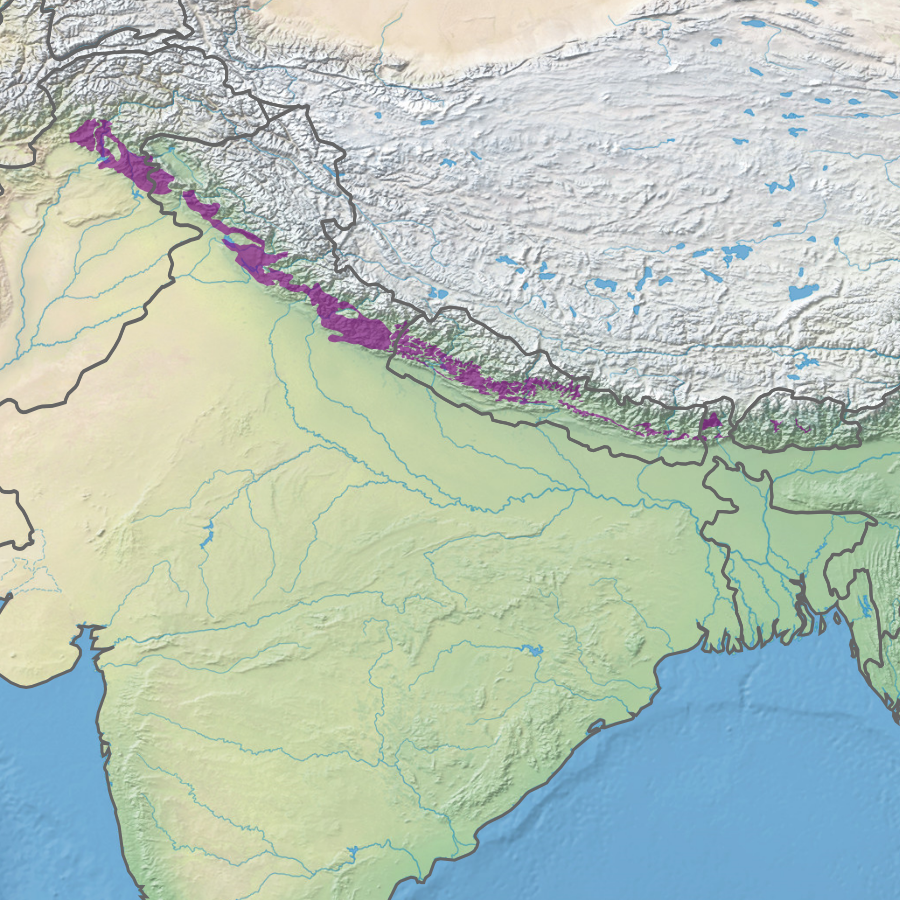
- Ecoregion territory (in purple)

Ecology
- Realm: Indomalayan
- Biome: Tropical and subtropical coniferous forests
- Borders: List: Western Himalayan subalpine conifer forests; Western Himalayan broadleaf forests; Northwestern Himalayan alpine shrub and meadows; Western Himalayan alpine shrub and meadows; Eastern Himalayan broadleaf forests; Himalayan subtropical broadleaf forests; Terai-Duar savanna and grasslands; Upper Gangetic Plains moist deciduous forests; Northwestern thorn scrub forests; Baluchistan xeric woodlands; Margalla hills
- Bird species: 469
- Mammal species: 162

Geography
- Area: 76,200 km^{2} (29,400 mi^{2})
- Countries: India; Bhutan; Nepal; Pakistan

Conservation
- Habitat loss: 86.65%
- Protected: 4.09%

The Himalayan subtropical pine forests are a large subtropical coniferous forest ecoregion covering portions of Bhutan, India, Nepal, and Pakistan.

== Geography ==
This huge pine forest stretches for 3000 km across the lower elevations of the great Himalaya range for almost its entire length including parts of Pakistan's Punjab Province in the west through Azad Kashmir, the northern Indian regions of Jammu and Kashmir, Himachal Pradesh, Uttarakhand and Sikkim, Nepal and Bhutan, which is the eastern extent of the pine forest. Like so many Himalayan ecosystems the pine forests are split by the deep Kali Gandaki Gorge in Nepal, to the west of which the forest is slightly drier while it is wetter and thicker to the east where the monsoon rains coming off the Bay of Bengal bring more moisture.

== Flora ==
The forest a thin woodland of drought-resistant trees dominated by Pinus roxburghii, Other species include:

- Acer campbellii
- Alnus nepalensis
- Artocarpus heterophyllus
- Betula alnoides
- Betula pendula
- Betula utilis
- Camphora officinarum
- Cyathea spinulosa
- Elaeagnus angustifolia
- Emmenopterys henryi
- Eucommia ulmoides
- Ficus benghalensis
- Gnetum gnemon
- Juglans regia
- Juniperus communis
- Juniperus tibetica
- Larix griffithii
- Mangifera indica
- Olea europaea subsp. cuspidata
- Picea brachytyla
- Prunus padus
- Prunus serrulata
- Quercus acutissima
- Quercus glauca
- Sassafras tzumu
- Shorea robusta
- Tamarix ramosissima
- Taxus sumatrana
- Tectona grandis
- Terminalia bellirica
- Terminalia elliptica
- Tetracentron
- Tetrameles nudiflora
- Toona ciliata
- Toona sinensis
- Tsuga dumosa
- Ulmus davidiana
- Ulmus lanceifolia
- Ulmus pumila

There is also a ground cover of thick grass, as regular fires do not allow a shrubby undergrowth to establish itself. The ground cover consists of Arundinella setosa, cogon grass (Imperata cylindrica) and Themeda anathera.

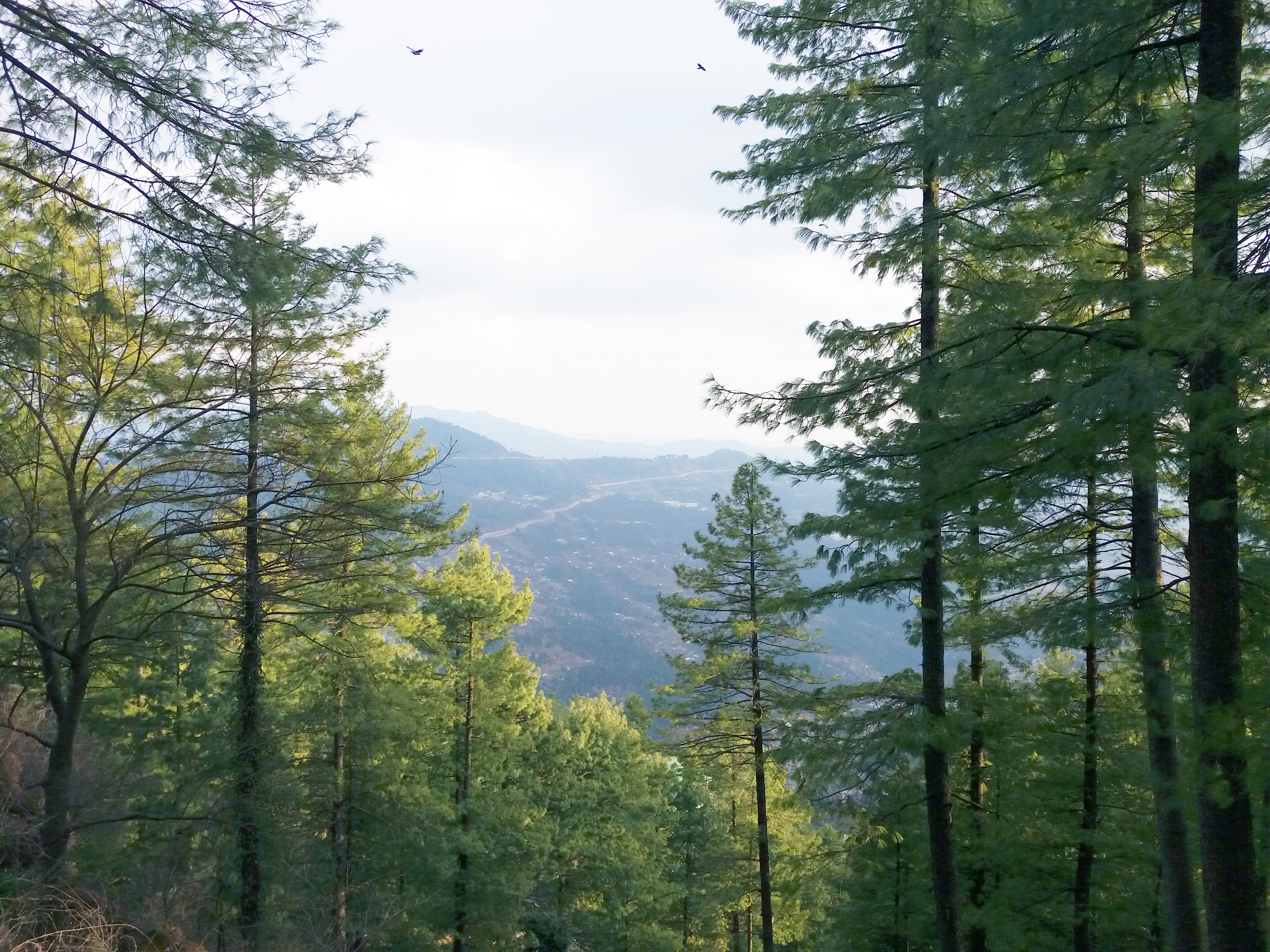
Pine forests of Murree, Pakistan.

Pine forest mainly grows on south-facing slopes although in western Nepal there are areas facing in other directions. Some of the larger areas can be found in the lower elevations of Kangra and Una Districts of Himachal Pradesh and in Bhutan. It occurs in smaller patches in eastern Himachal Pradesh and lower Uttarakhand, in the more thinly populated western Nepal, and on the lower elevations (between 1,000 and 2,000m) of the Sivalik and Himachal ranges.

== Fauna ==
Although there is not a rich variety of wildlife here when compared to tropical rainforest for example the region is important habitat, especially for birds. Wildlife includes tigers and Indian leopards although in smaller numbers than in the lowland areas where herds of grazing antelopes provide food for them, whereas these slopes do not sustain grazing in large numbers. The ecoregion is also home to the rare Himalayan goral. More typical animals of the pine forest are langurs, macaques, wild boar and other animals of the Himalayas. Birds include the chestnut-breasted partridge, kalij pheasant and cheer pheasants that hide in the lush grass.

== Conservation ==
These habitats are vulnerable to logging for firewood or conversion to grazing or farmland and more than half the area has been cleared or degraded which then allows the mountain water to wash away the soil quickly. The most profound changes can be seen in central and eastern Nepal, where the forest has been cleared for terrace farming. The protected areas of pine forest are small but include part of the larger Jim Corbett National Park. The Ayubia National Park and Murree-Kotli Sattian-Kahuta National Park is also part of this ecoregion.

== See also ==
- List of ecoregions in India
