= Western Himalayan broadleaf forests =

Temperate mixed forest ecoregion in western Himalaya

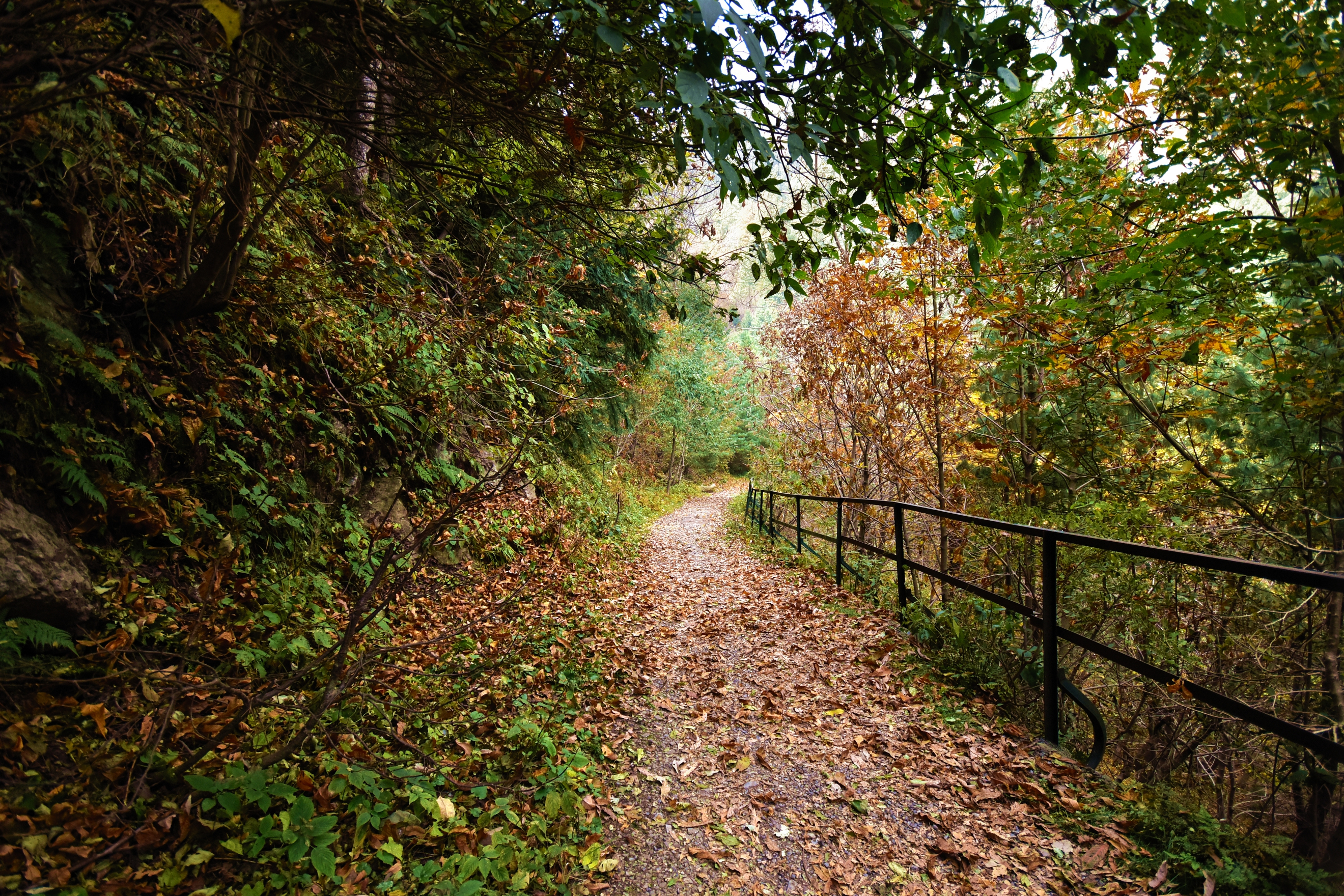
- Broadleaf forests in Ayubia National Park

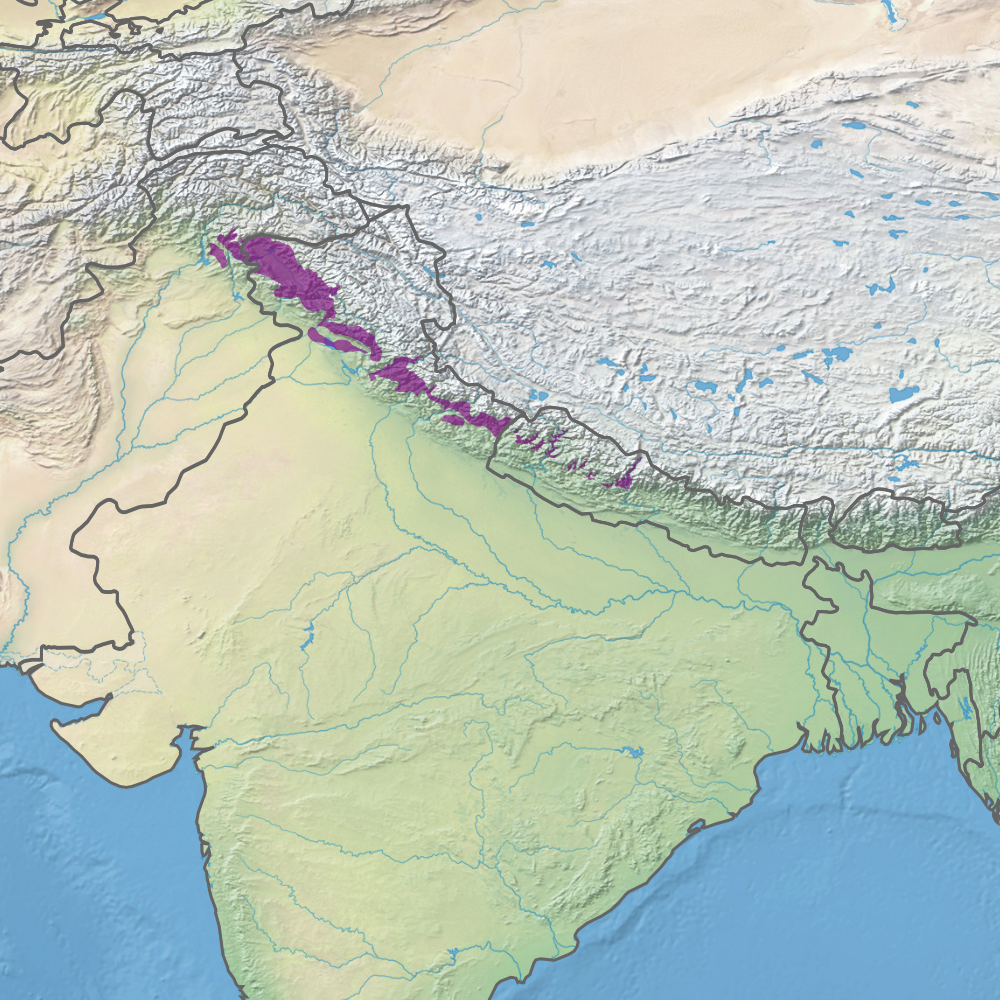
- Ecoregion territory (in purple)

Ecology
- Biome: Temperate broadleaf and mixed forests
- Borders: Western Himalayan subalpine conifer forests; Himalayan subtropical pine forests; Northwestern thorn scrub forests; Margalla hills
- Bird species: 126
- Mammal species: 115

Geography
- Area: 55,900 km^{2} (21,600 mi^{2})
- Countries: Nepal; Pakistan; India

Conservation
- Habitat loss: 78.237%
- Protected: 6.62%

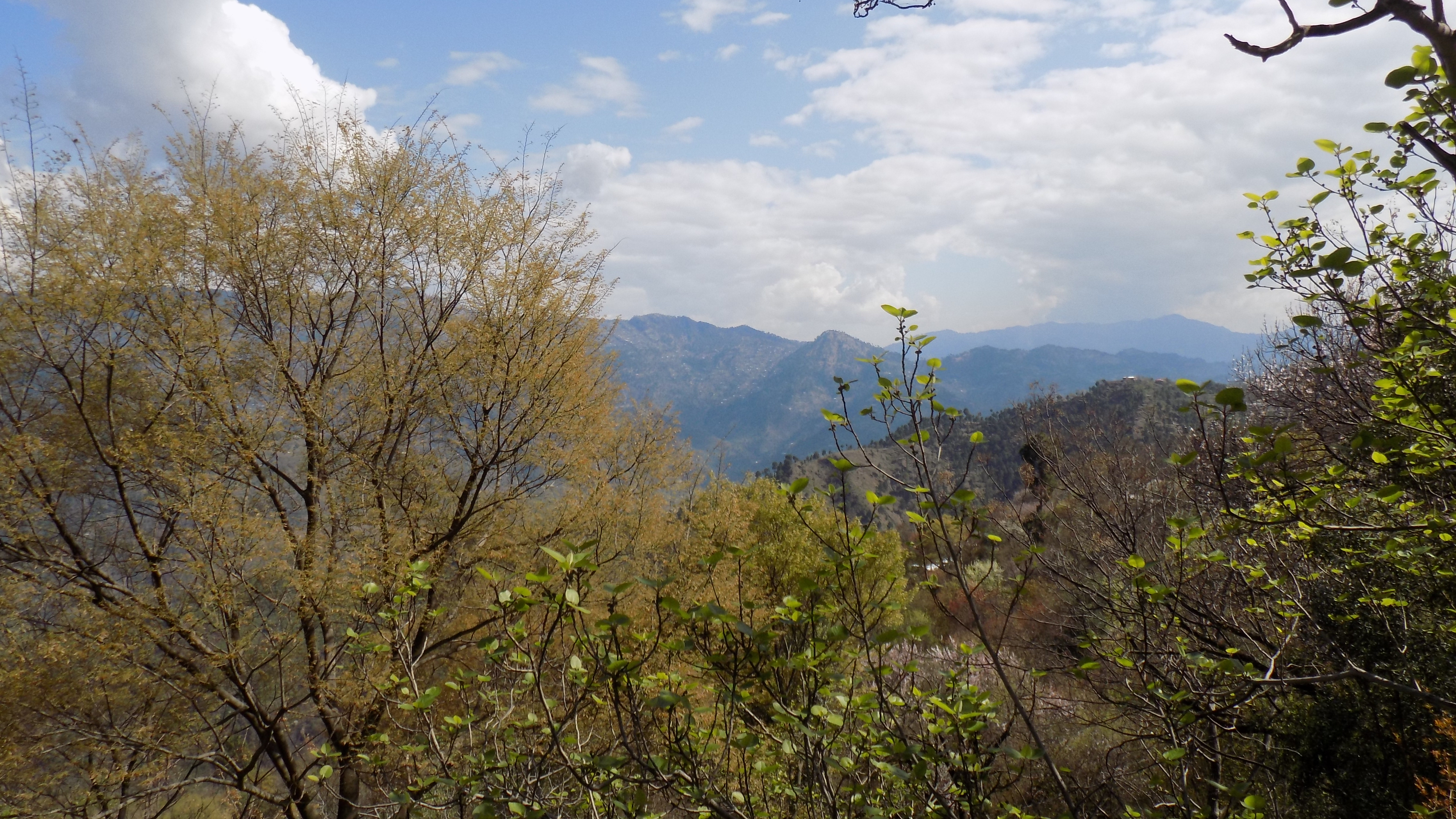
Broadleaf forests in Azad Kashmir.

The Western Himalayan broadleaf forests is a temperate broadleaf and mixed forest ecoregion which is found in the middle elevations of the western Himalayas, including parts of Nepal, India, and Pakistan.

== Setting ==
The ecoregion forms an area of temperate broadleaf forest covering 55,900 square kilometres (21,600 mi^{2}) in a narrow band between 1,500 to 2,600 metres (4,900 to 8,500 ft) elevation, extending from the Gandaki River gorge in Nepal, through Uttarakhand, Himachal Pradesh and Jammu and Kashmir in northern India into parts of northern Pakistan. This ecoregion is drier and the forest is more fragmented than its Eastern Himalayan broadleaf forests counterpart, which receives more moisture from the Bay of Bengal monsoon but is still valuable habitat especially as part of the pattern of habitats found at different elevations on the Himalayan mountainsides. Many species of birds and animals migrate up and down the mountains seasonally from the grasslands of the plains below to the high peaks.

At lower elevations, this ecoregion grades into Himalayan subtropical pine forests. At higher elevations, it grades into Western Himalayan subalpine conifer forests as well as Northwestern Himalayan alpine shrub and meadows and Western Himalayan alpine shrub and meadows.

== Flora ==
The Western Himalayan broadleaf forests may be divided into forests of two types: evergreen and deciduous broadleaved forests.

In both types of forests, the dominant trees are Pinus roxburghii, Shorea robusta, Olea europaea subsp. cuspidata, and Taxus sumatrana

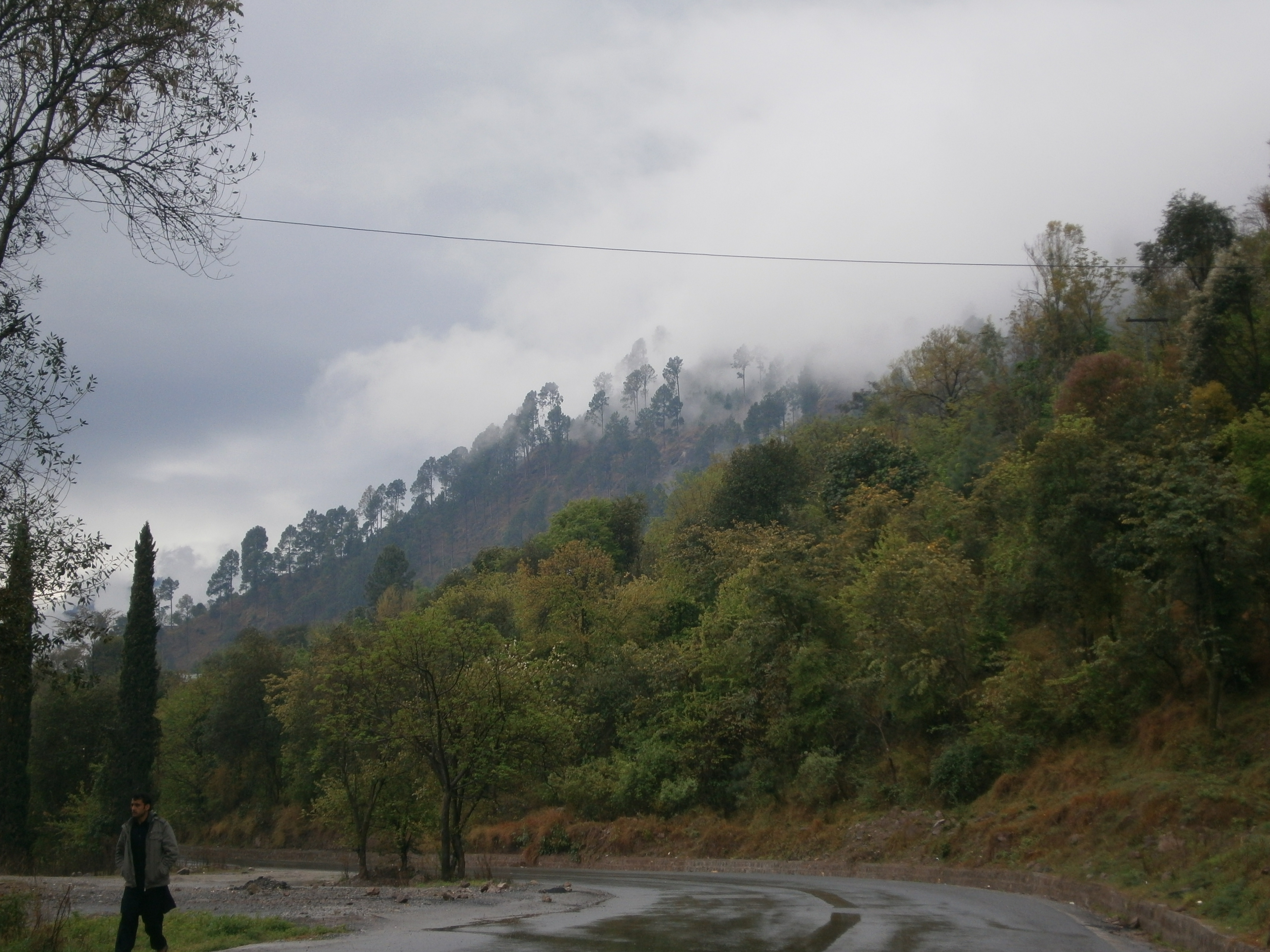
Forests in Garhi Dupatta, Azad Kashmir.

The evergreen broadleaf forest is dominated by oaks, consisting of Quercus semecarpifolia, Quercus leucotrichophora, Quercus floribunda, Quercus lanata, Quercus glauca and Quercus baloot. This forest is typically found on moister southern slopes, which are more influenced by the monsoon. Various Lauraceae call this forest home, including Machilus odoratissimus, Litsea umbrosa, Litsea lanuginosa, and Phoebe pulcherrima. The understory features a rich assemblage of ferns, mosses, and epiphytes. On northern slopes, drier areas, and higher elevations, conifers like Abies, Picea, Cedrus, and Pinus thrives. The wild olive, olea cuspidata is found here too.

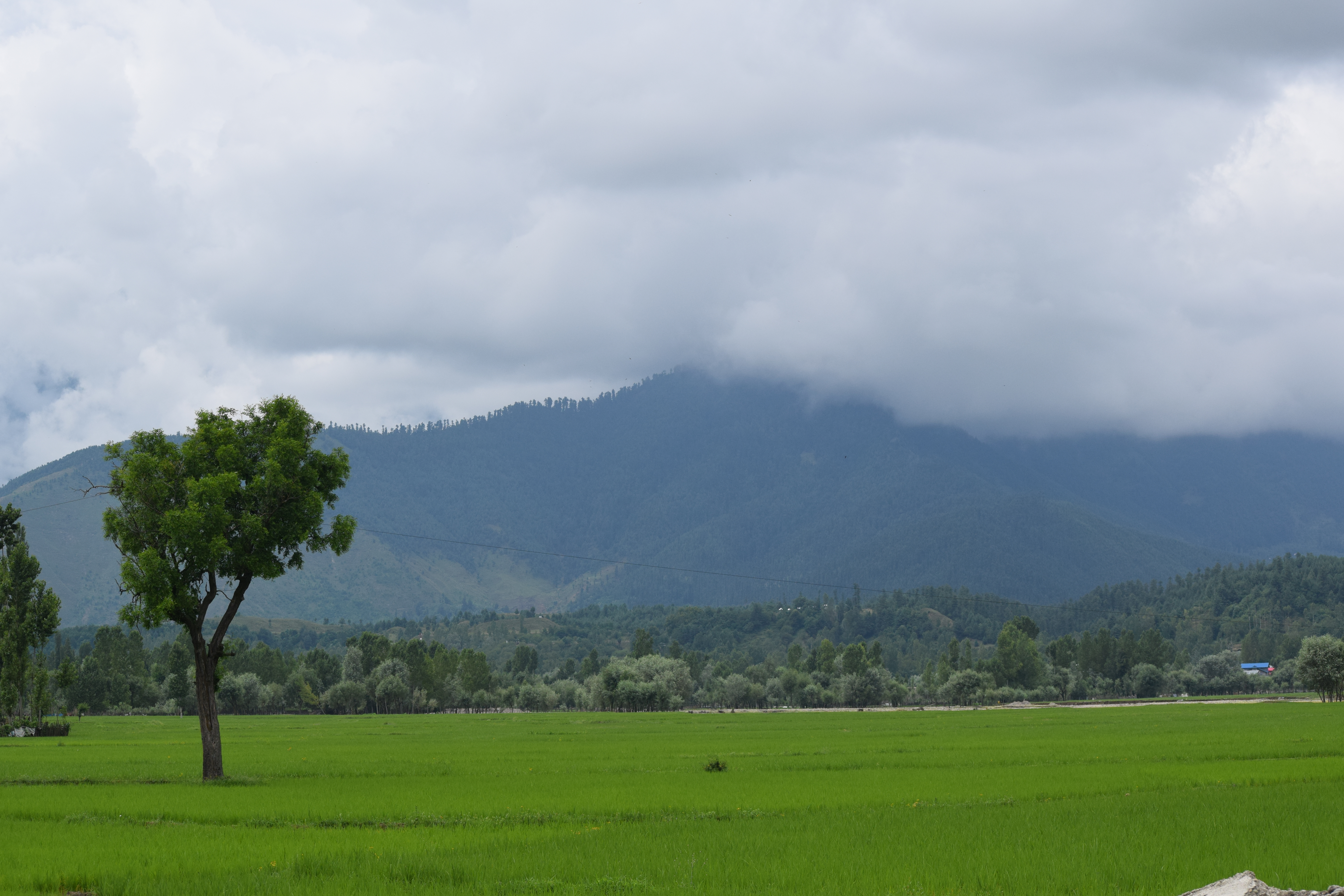
Lolab Valley, Kupwara

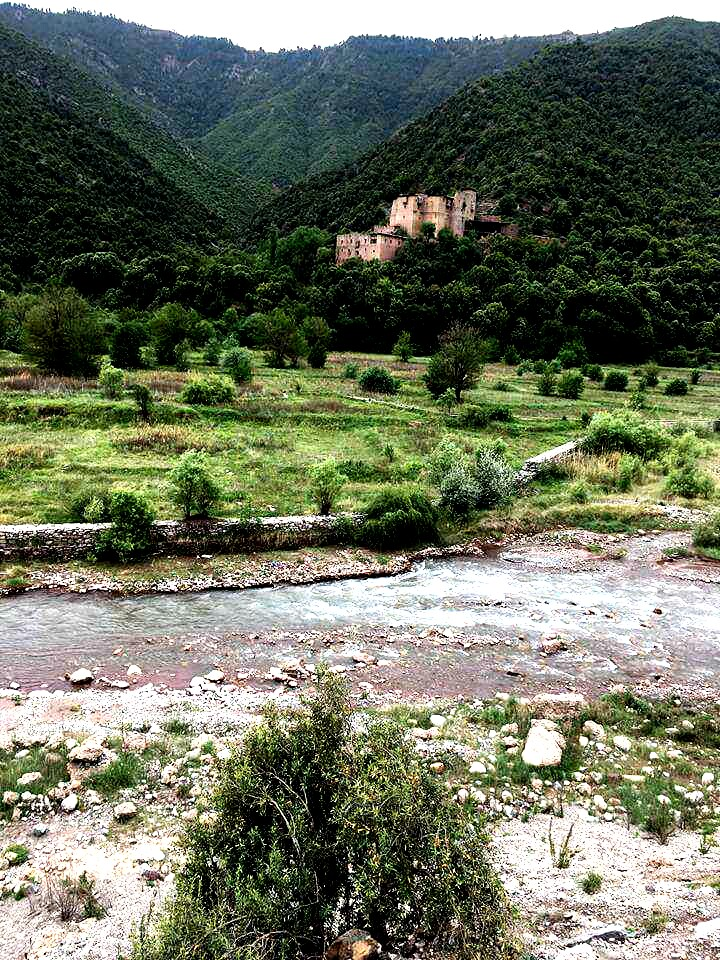
Satora, Abbottabad

The deciduous forest is found along rivers west of the Gandaki River. It includes Aesculus indica, Juglans regia, Carpinus viminea, Alnus nepalensis, and several Acer species like Acer caesium, Acer acuminatum, Acer cappadocicum, Acer lobelia subsp. pictum, Acer oblongum, etc are found. In drier areas such as the valley of the upper Ghaghara River it includes Populus ciliata, Ulmus wallichiana, and Corylus jacquemontii as well and the riverbanks are dominated by Himalayan alder (Alnus nitida). Platanus orientalis is also found in these areas.

== Fauna ==
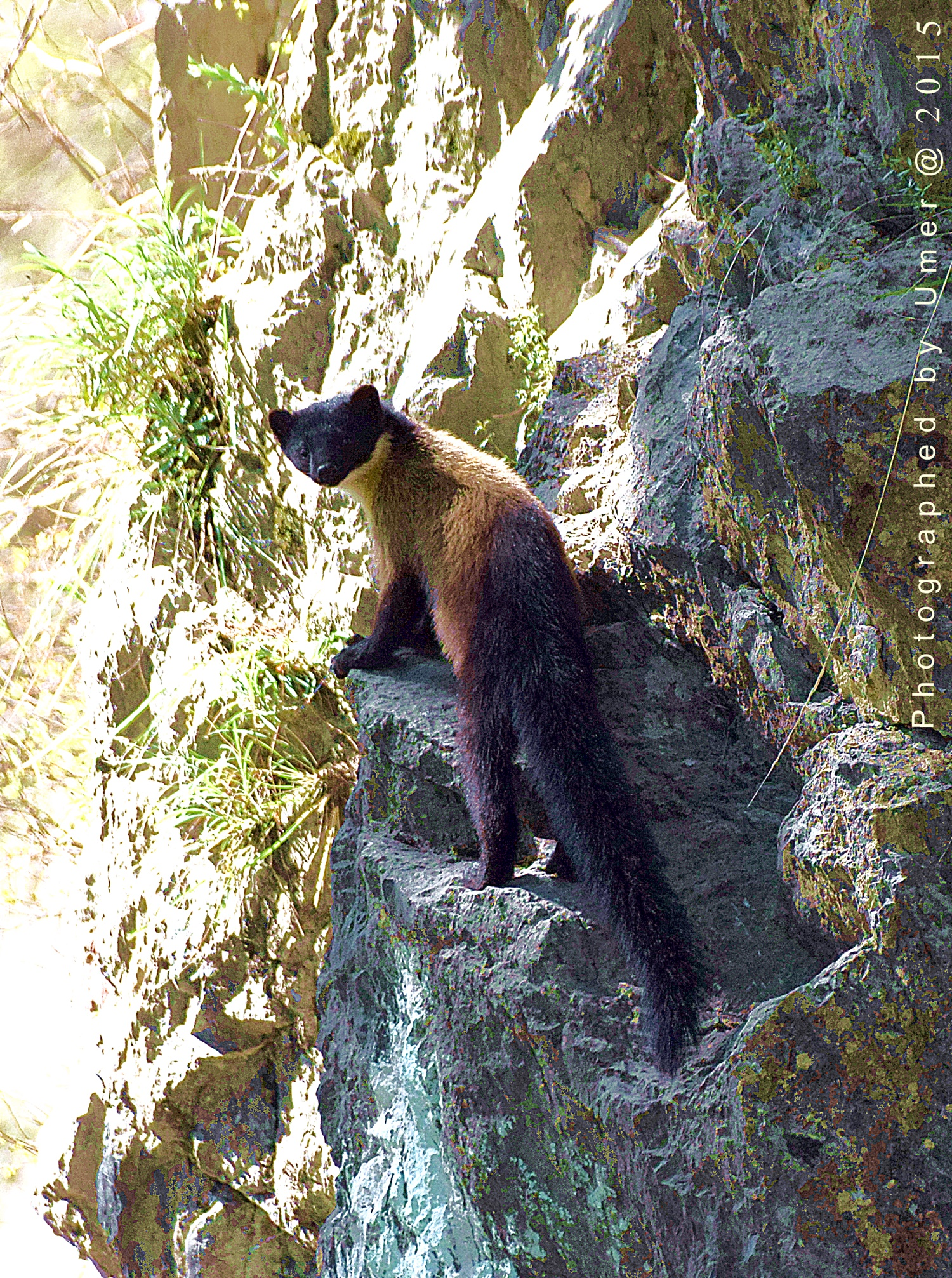
Yellow-throated marten in Galyat

Although there is less wildlife here than in the wetter Eastern Himalayas, this ecoregion is home to seventy-six species of mammals. These include the Asiatic black bear (Ursus thibetanus), Indian leopard (Panthera pardus fusca), yellow-throated marten (Martes flavigula), Red giant flying squirrel (Petaurista petaurista), leopard cat (Prionailurus bengalensis), the Himalayan tahr (Hemitragus jemlahicus), as well as the threatened Himalayan serow (Capricornis thar) and Himalayan goral (Naemorhedus goral). There is one endemic mammal, the Kashmir cave bat (Myotis longipes) while the threatened Peter's tube-nosed bat (Murina grisea) is near-endemic.

About 315 species of birds have been recorded in this ecoregion from tiny warblers to large pheasants such as the western tragopan (Tragopan melanocephalus), satyr tragopan (Tragopan satyra), koklass pheasant (Pucrasia macrolopha), Himalayan monal (Lophophorus impejanus) and cheer pheasant (Catreus wallichi). Near-endemic birds of the forests include the white-cheeked tit, white-throated tit, spectacled finch, Kashmir flycatcher, Tytler's leaf-warbler, orange bullfinch, and Kashmir nuthatch, while the Himalayan quail which used to be found here is now thought to be extinct.

== Threats and conservation ==
The Himalayas receive large numbers of visitors every year including religious pilgrims and trekkers. Although there a large number of protected areas each of them are quite small and most of original forest has been cleared for logging or for agricultural land, a process which is ongoing. Only a third remains unspoilt, with the largest patches remaining in the west of the ecoregion and any forest clearance on these steep mountainsides quickly results in soil erosion and oversilting of the rivers below. Protected areas in this ecoregion include Askot Musk Deer Sanctuary, and parts of the Govind Pashu Vihar Wildlife Sanctuary, Ayubia National Park, Machiara National Park, Rupi Bhabha Sanctuary and the large Kishtwar National Park.

== See also ==
- List of ecoregions in India

Indomalayan temperate broadleaf and mixed forests ecoregions
Eastern Himalayan broadleaf forests	India, Nepal, Bhutan, Myanmar, China
Northern Triangle temperate forests	Myanmar
Western Himalayan broadleaf forests	India, Pakistan, Nepal
