= Northern Triangle temperate forests =

Ecoregion in Myanmar

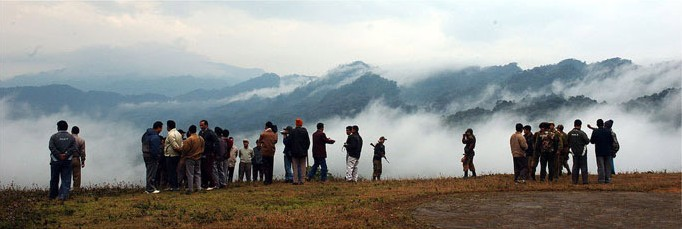
- Pangsau Pass

Ecology
- Biome: Temperate broadleaf and mixed forest
- Borders: Eastern Himalayan broadleaf forests; Eastern Himalayan alpine shrub and meadows; Nujiang Lancang Gorge alpine conifer and mixed forests; Northern Triangle subtropical forests
- Bird species: 365
- Mammal species: 91

Geography
- Area: 10,620 km^{2} (4,100 mi^{2})
- Country: Myanmar
- States: Kachin State; Sagaing Region
- Elevation: 1,830–2,700 metres (6,000–8,860 ft)

Conservation
- Conservation status: Relatively Stable/Intact

The Northern Triangle temperate forests is a temperate broadleaf and mixed forest ecoregion of thick forest covering the mountains of northern Myanmar.

== Setting ==
The Northern Triangle temperate forests occupy the southern slopes of the Namkiu Mountains, the easternmost extension of Himalayas, and extend southeast along the Patkai Range on the border between Myanmar and India, in Kachin State and Sagaing Division of Myanmar, an area that is part of the Golden Triangle. The mountains run north to south towards the central plain of Myanmar and the forests lie between 1,830–2,700 metres (6,000–8,860 ft) in elevation. The Chindwin, Mali, and N'Mai Rivers all have their sources in these mountains and run south to join the Irrawaddy River.

The Northern Triangle subtropical forests lie to the south, while the Eastern Himalayan broadleaf forests lie to the northwest across the Patkai Range. The Eastern Himalayan alpine shrub and meadows bound the ecoregion to the north. The Northern Triangle temperate forests are similar to the Eastern Himalayan broadleaf forests, which occupy the middle elevations of the Himalaya range in Eastern India, Bhutan, and eastern Nepal, and extend along the north slope of the Patkai range in Arunachal Pradesh.

== Flora ==
The main plant communities of the Northern Triangle temperate forests are broadleaf forests and mixed forests. The forests are diverse, blending plants characteristic of the tropical floras of the Eastern Himalayas with those of Assam, the Indian subcontinent and Indochina and the temperate floras of the Himalayas and China and even some relict plants of the ancient continent of Gondwana. Furthermore the Northern Triangle Temperate forests have been little explored by scientists since the work of Frank Kingdon-Ward in the 1920s and 1930s and their biodiversity is likely underestimated.

The evergreen broadleaf forests lie between 1,830 and 2,100 metres (6,000 and 6,890 ft) elevation. Characteristic trees and shrubs include alder (alnus nepalensis), chinkapin beech (castanopsis spp.), schima-trees (schima spp.), magnolia (michelia spp.), oak (quercus spp.), machilus, and exbucklandia (exbucklandia populnea).

The mixed forests lie above 2,100 metres (6,900 ft) in elevation, characterized by broadleaf trees such as oak, magnolia, maple, prunus, holly, and rhododendron, mixed with conifers like picea brachytyla, Himalayan hemlock (tsuga dumosa), Sikkim larch (larix griffithiana), and cypress (taiwania flousiana).

Subalpine conifer forests lie between the temperate forests and the alpine meadows of the easternmost Himalayas.

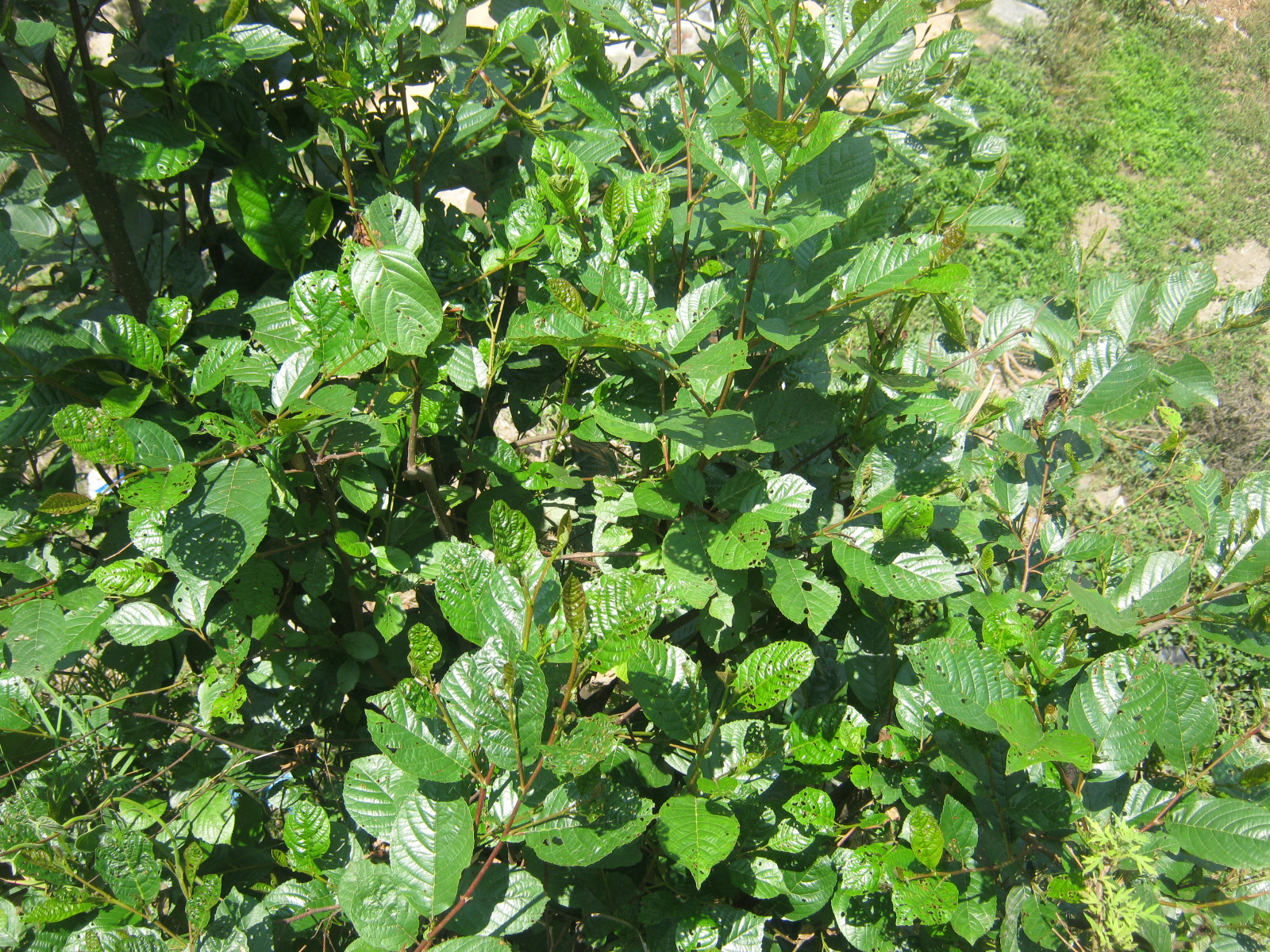
Nepalese Alder

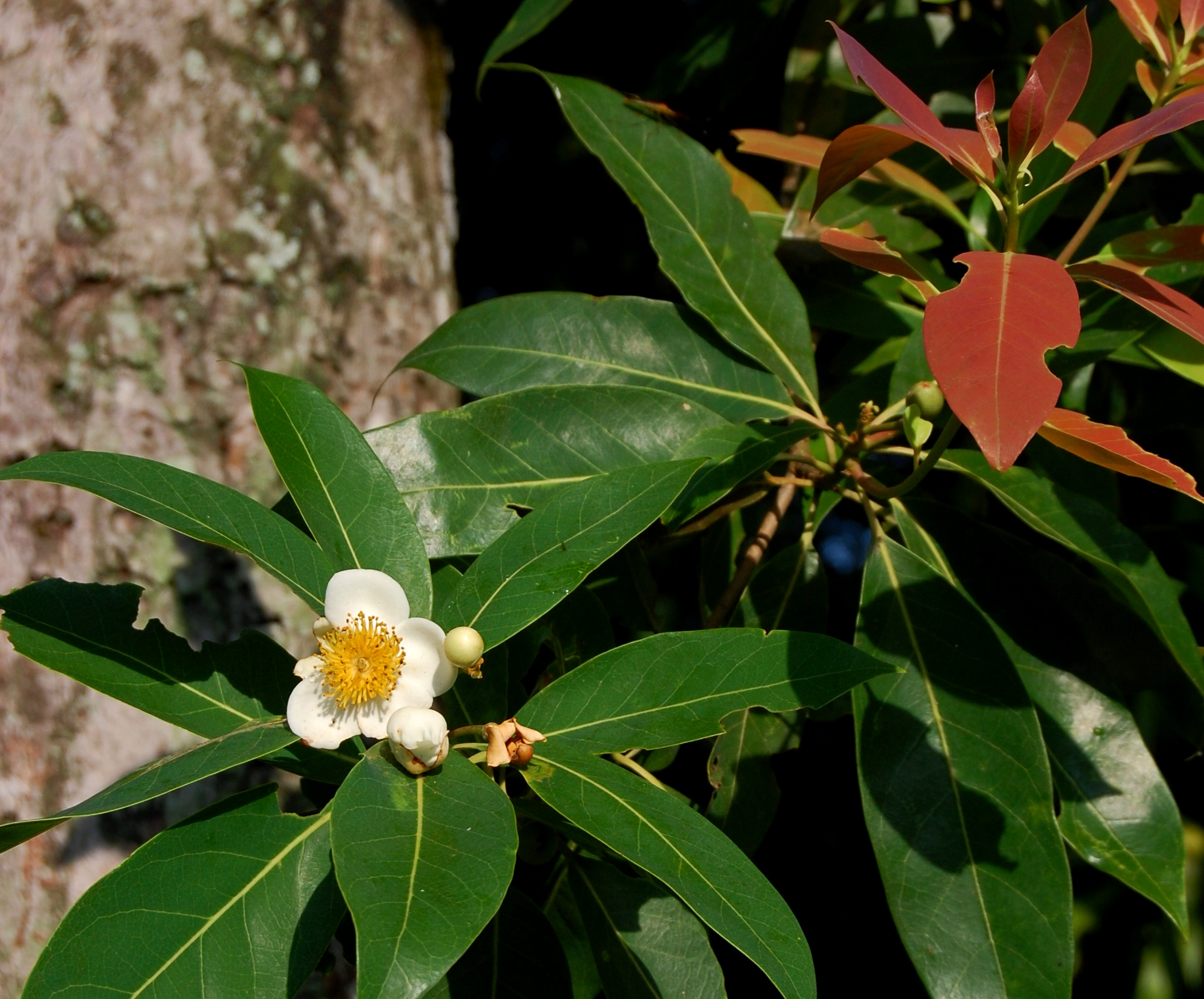
Schima trees (here schima wallichii, part of the tea-plant family)

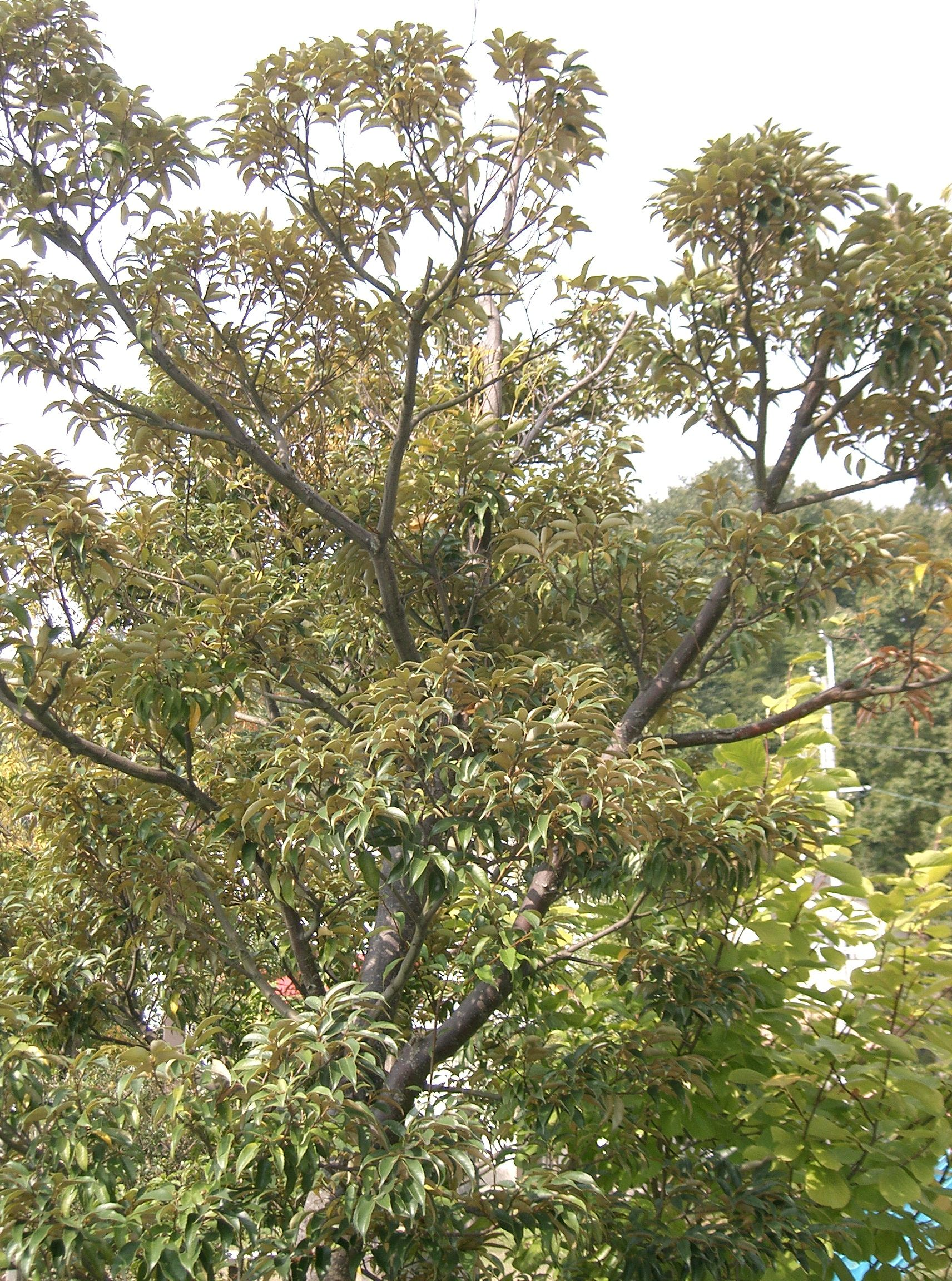
Chinkapin beech

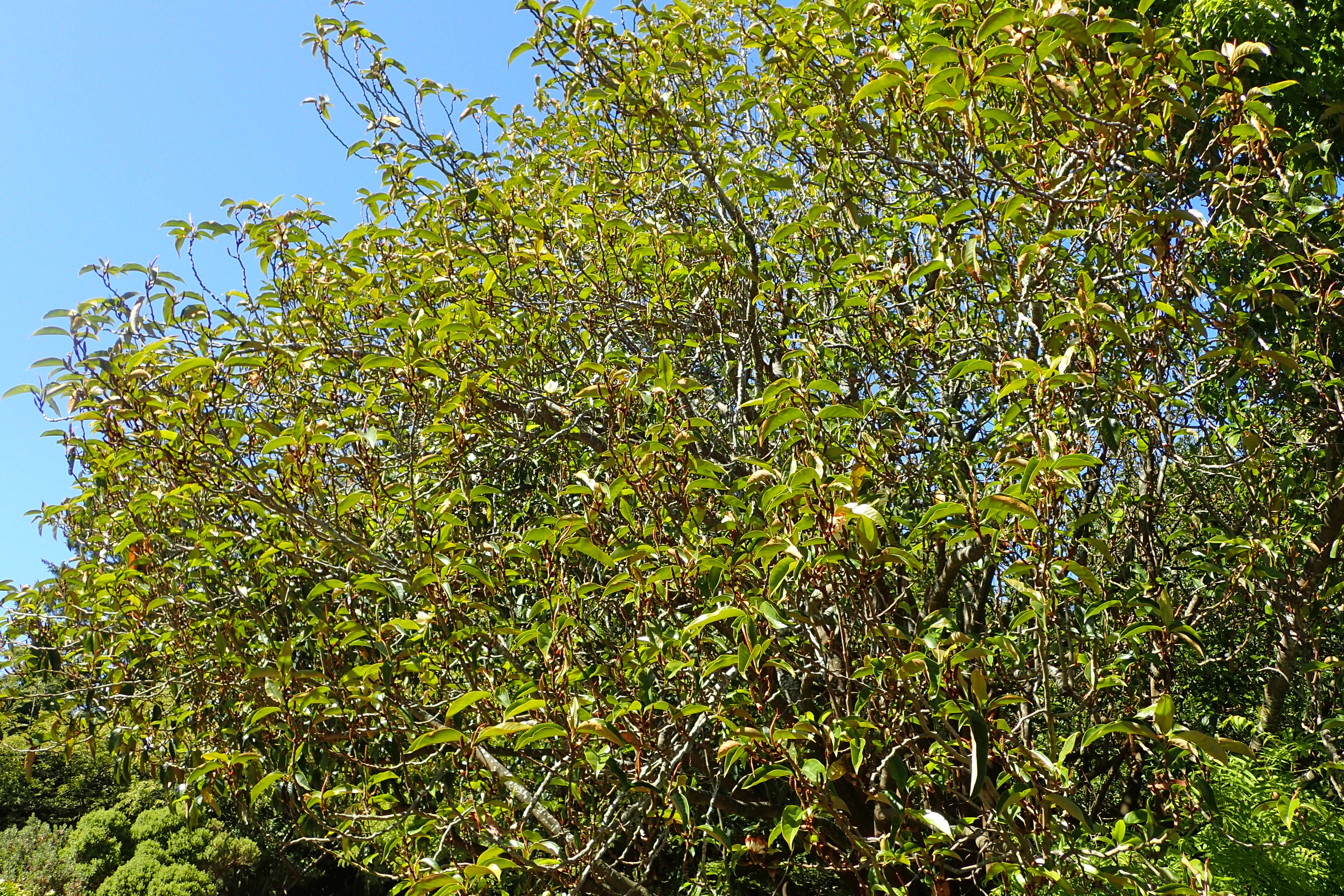
Magnolia

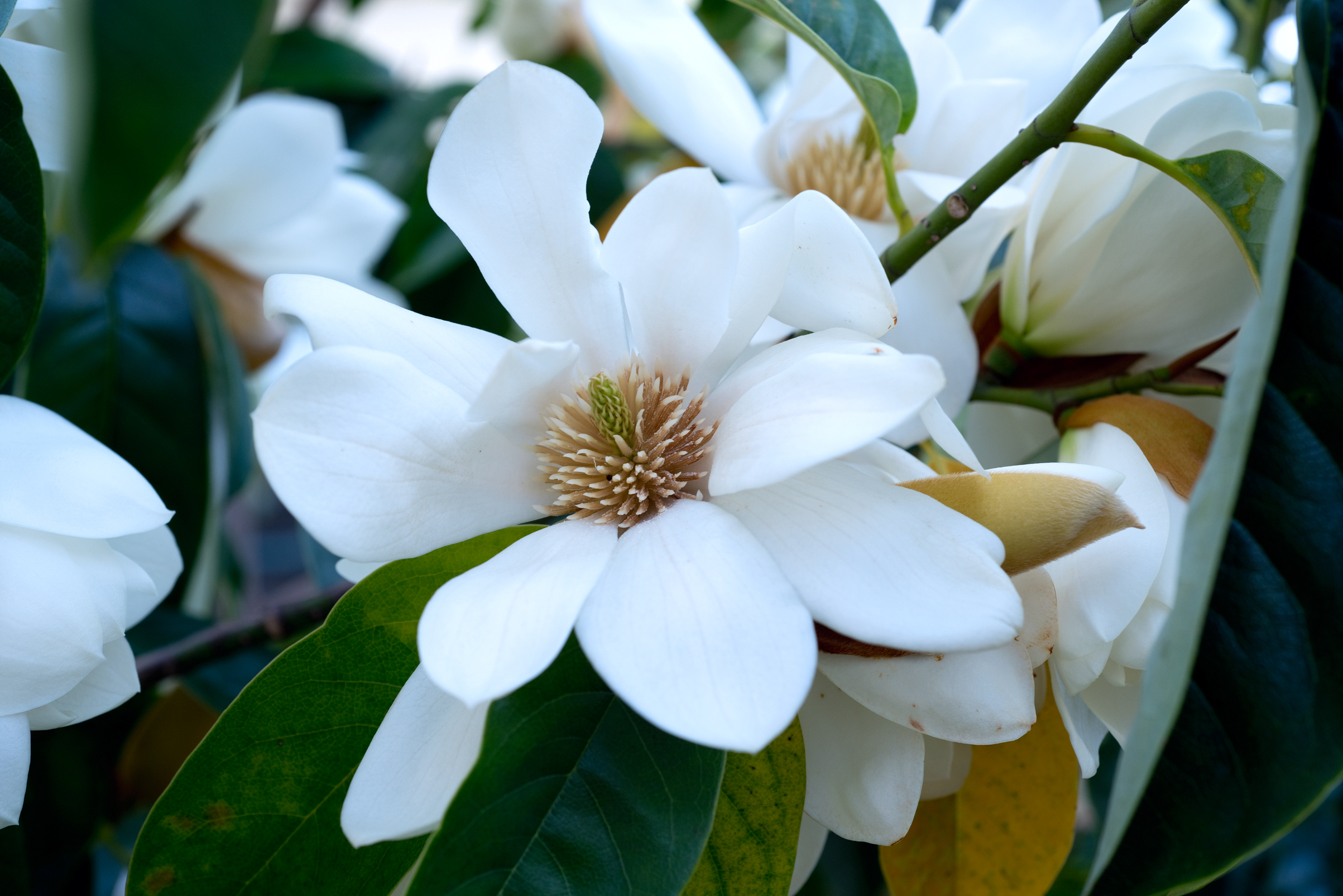
Magnolia-flower (here the fragrant flowers of magnolia doltsopa)

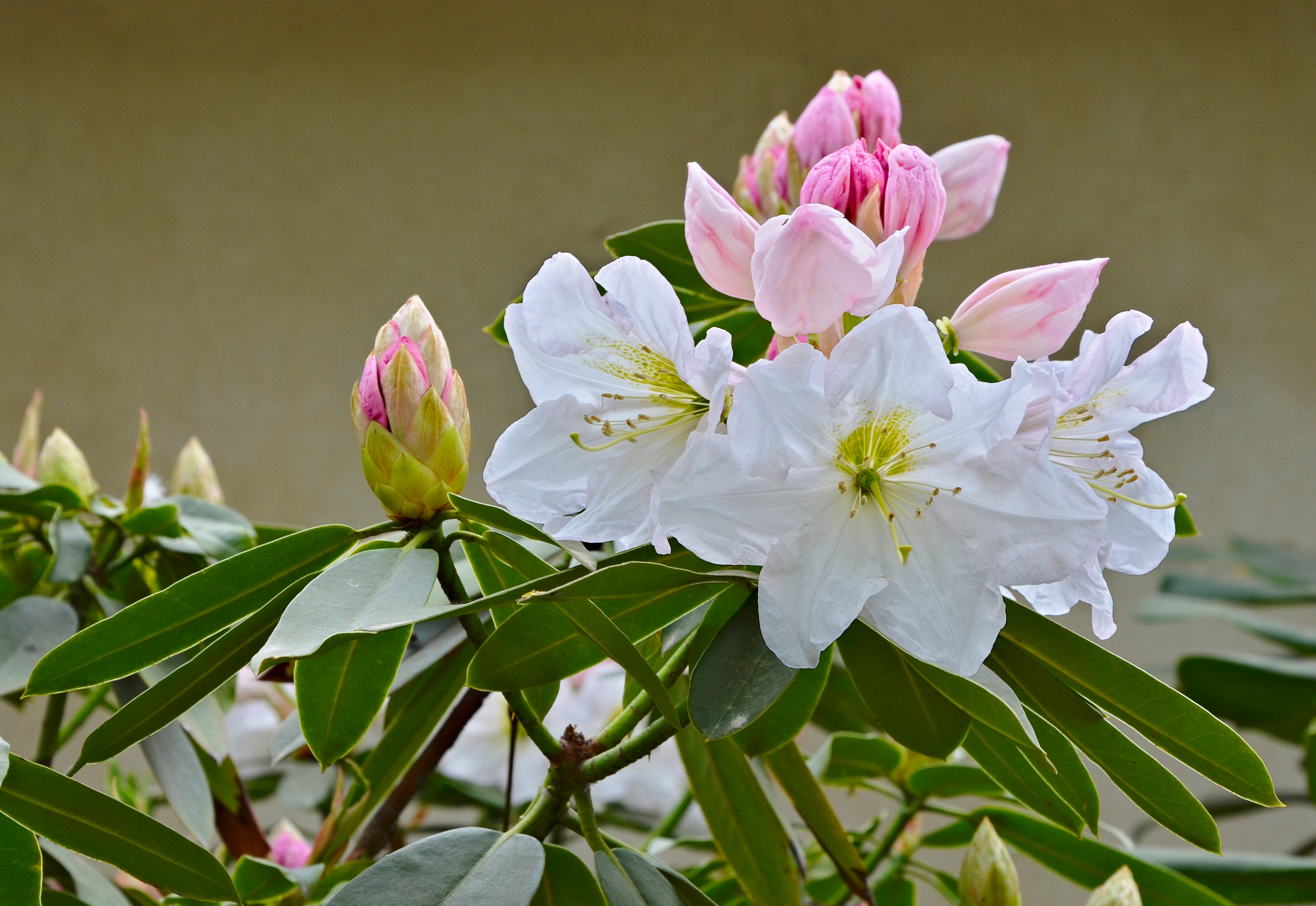
Rhododendron

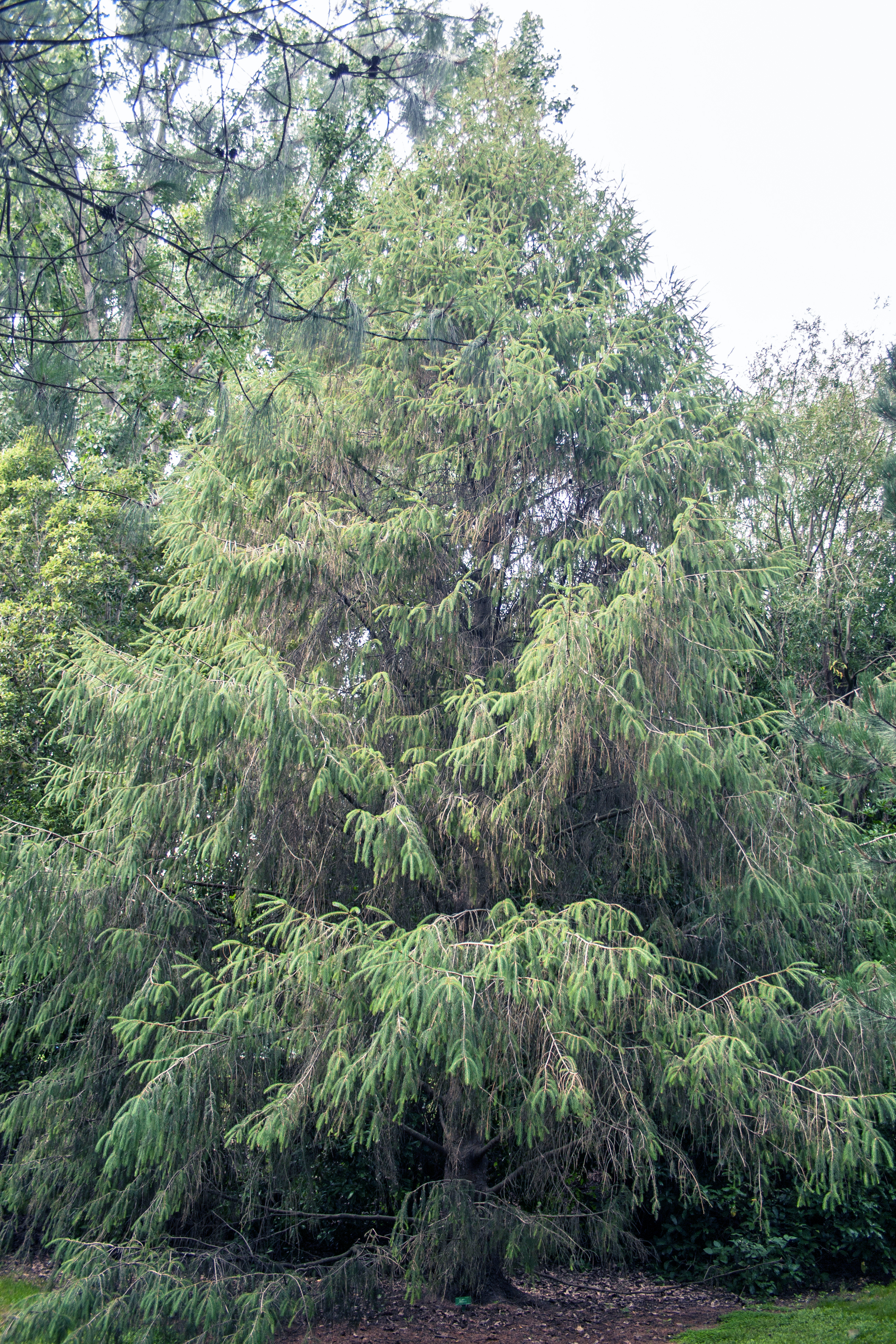
picea brachytyla

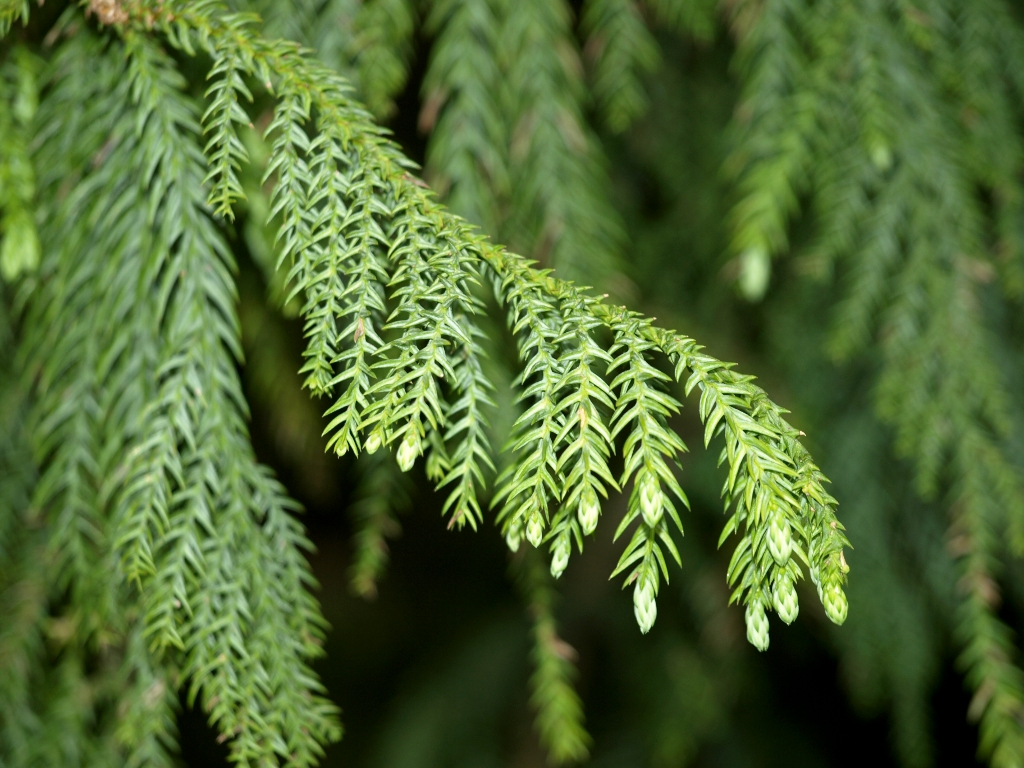
Taiwania cypress

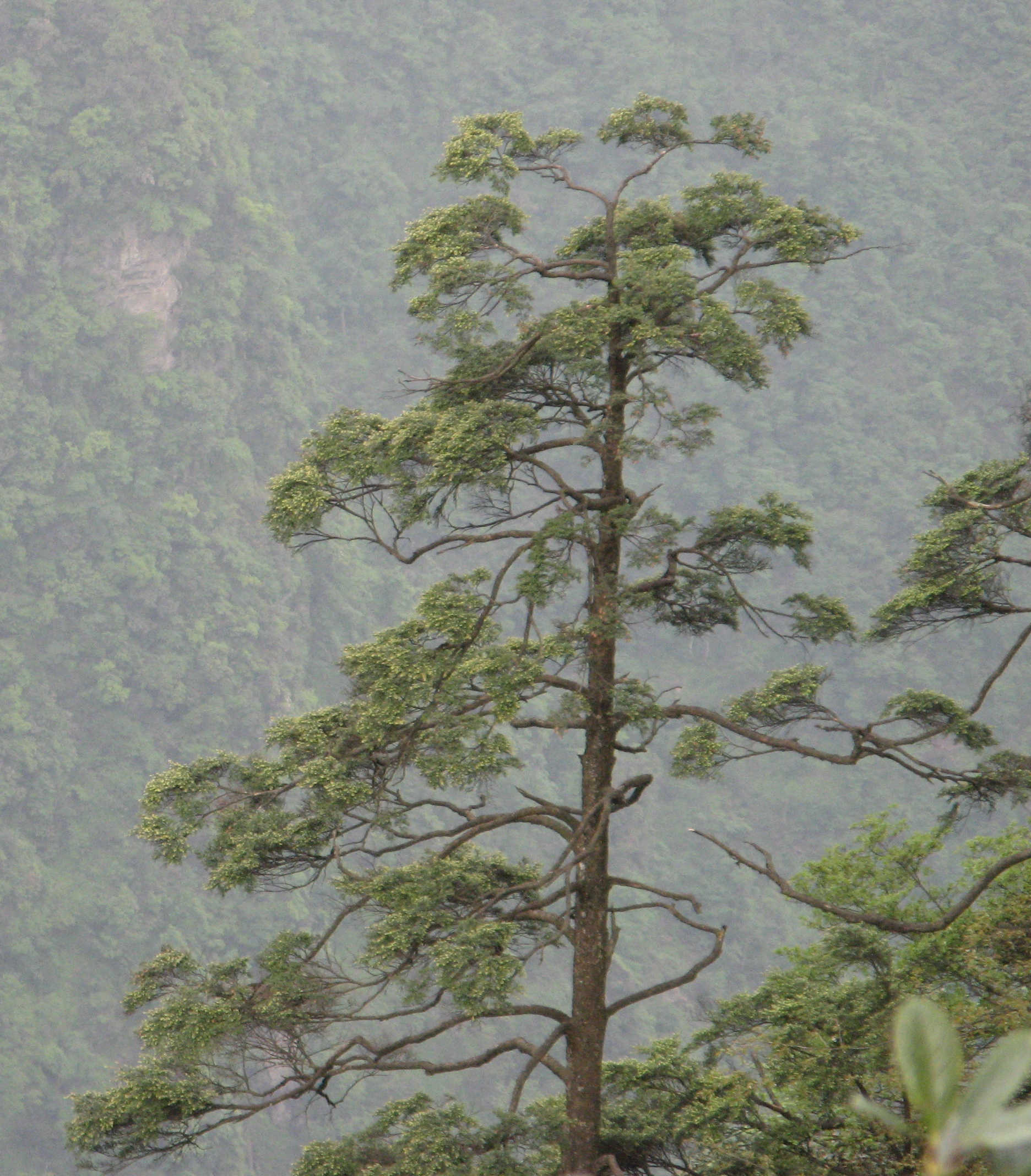
Himalayan hemlock

== Fauna ==
The ecoregion is home to at least a hundred mammals, possibly more, including a number of threatened species such as the Indochinese tiger (Panthera tigris corbetti), the large takin (Budorcas taxicolor), clouded leopard (Neofelis nebulosa), red panda (Ailurus fulgens), Ussuri dhole (Cuon alpinus alpinus), Asiatic black bear (Ursus thibetanus), stump-tailed macaque (Macaca arctoides), capped leaf monkey (Trachypithecus pileatus), red goral (Naemorhedus baileyi), great Indian civet (Viverra zibetha), back-striped weasel (Mustela strigidorsa), Irrawaddy squirrel (Callosciurus pygerythrus), and particolored flying squirrel (Hylopetes alboniger).

The ecoregion is home to a single endemic mammal species, the Gongshan muntjac (Muntiacus gongshanensis) possibly along with another muntjac deer, Fea's muntjac. The rusty-bellied shortwing (Brachypteryx hyperythra) is the ecoregion's only known endemic bird species but the forests are important habitat to many other bird species while both birds and mammals have crucial migration routes up and down the mountains through different types of habitat including these temperate forests.

== Threats and preservation ==
Because these steep mountainsides are so remote the forest is largely undamaged. However, they are also unprotected, and as the hill tribe population increases they are liable to be cleared for logging and to make space for planting.
