= Streptomyces alni =

Scientific classification
- Domain: Bacteria
- Kingdom: Bacillati
- Phylum: Actinomycetota
- Class: Actinomycetia
- Order: Streptomycetales
- Family: Streptomycetaceae
- Genus: Streptomyces
- Species: S. alni

Binomial name
- Streptomyces alni Liu et al. 2009

Type strain
- ATCC 27415, BCRC 15198, CBS 100.41, CBS 754.72, CCRC 15198, DSM 40557, ETH 16825, IFO 13453, ISP 5557, NBRC 13453, RIA 1414, VKM Ac-1005

Species of bacterium

Streptomyces alni is a Gram-positive, aerobic, mesophilic bacterium species from the genus Streptomyces which has been isolated from roots of the tree Alnus nepalensis in Xishuangbanna on the Nannuo Mountain in China.

== See also ==
- List of Streptomyces species
