= Lithocarpus pachyphyllus =

Conservation status
- Least Concern (IUCN 3.1)

Scientific classification
- Kingdom: Plantae
- Clade: Embryophytes
- Clade: Tracheophytes
- Clade: Angiosperms
- Clade: Eudicots
- Clade: Rosids
- Order: Fagales
- Family: Fagaceae
- Genus: Lithocarpus
- Species: L. pachyphyllus

Binomial name
- Lithocarpus pachyphyllus (Kurz) Rehder

Varieties
- Lithocarpus pachyphyllus var. fruticosus (Watt ex King) A.Camus; Lithocarpus pachyphyllus var. pachyphyllus

Synonyms
- List: Quercus pachyphylla Kurz (basionym, 1875); Synaedrys pachyphylla (Kurz) Koidz.; Pasania pachyphylla (Kurz) Schottky; Lithocarpus hypoviridis Y.C.Hsu, B.S.Sun & H.J.Qian; Lithocarpus dulongensis H.Li & Y.C.Hsu

Species of evergreen tree

Lithocarpus pachyphyllus, the thick-leaved stone oak, is a broadleaf evergreen tree in the beech family Fagaceae, native to the eastern Himalayas and adjoining mountains of Myanmar and southern-central China.

== Taxonomy ==
It was originally described in 1875 by the German-Polish botanist Wilhelm Sulpiz Kurz as Quercus pachyphylla, on the basis of material from Sikkim published in the Journal of the Asiatic Society of Bengal, and was transferred to the stone oak genus Lithocarpus by Alfred Rehder in 1919; the specific epithet, from the Ancient Greek pachys "thick" and phyllon "leaf", refers to the species' notably coriaceous foliage.

== Description ==
The species reaches around 30 m (98 ft) in height in the wild and has glabrous, entire, leathery, elliptic to oblong-lanceolate leaves about 6–15 cm (2.4–5.9 in) long with a metallic-glaucous lower surface, axillary spikes of pale yellow male flowers, and woody acorn cups enclosing about half of the nut.

== Habitat and ecology ==
It is widespread in the mid-elevation evergreen broadleaf forests of Nepal, Bhutan, Sikkim, Arunachal Pradesh, the Naga Hills, Yunnan, southeastern Tibet, northern Myanmar and adjacent Bangladesh at elevations of about 800 to 3,200 m (2,600 to 10,500 ft), where it is commonly a canopy or co-canopy species alongside Quercus lamellosa, Rhododendron species and Magnolia-Michelia broadleafs; in a stratified survey of 83 plots along the Sikkim elevational gradient, L. pachyphyllus was the single most important species in the high-elevation (2,500–3,200 m or 8,200–10,500 ft) forest community, with a species importance value index of 24.37 per cent.

== Use and cultivation ==
The bark and timber are used locally for construction and fuelwood across its range, and the species is in limited cultivation in the milder counties of the British Isles and Atlantic Europe, where mature specimens grow at Caerhays Castle, Wakehurst Place and the Sir Harold Hillier Gardens.
