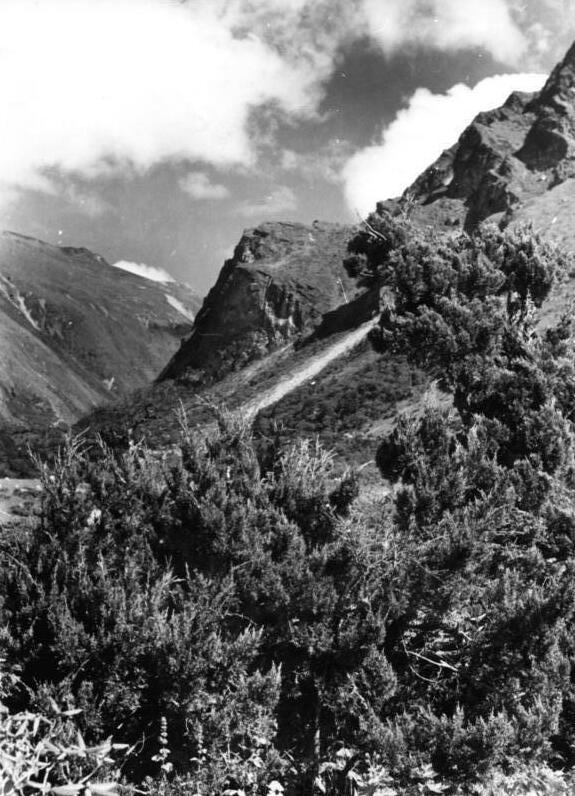
- Bundesarchiv Bild 135-S-05-06-08, Tibetexpedition, Landschaftsaufnahme

Conservation status
- Vulnerable (IUCN 3.1)

Scientific classification
- Kingdom: Plantae
- Clade: Tracheophytes
- Clade: Gymnospermae
- Division: Pinophyta
- Class: Pinopsida
- Order: Cupressales
- Family: Cupressaceae
- Genus: Juniperus
- Species: J. tibetica

Binomial name
- Juniperus tibetica Kom.

Synonyms
- Juniperus distans Florin; Juniperus potaninii Kom.; Juniperus zaidamensis Kom.; Sabina potaninii (Kom.) Kom.; Sabina tibetica (Kom.) Kom.; Sabina tibetica (Kom.) W.C.Cheng & L.K.Fu

= Juniperus tibetica =

Species of conifer

Juniperus tibetica, the Tibetan juniper, is a species of juniper, native to western China in southern Gansu, southeastern Qinghai, Sichuan, and Tibet Autonomous Region, where it grows at high to very high elevations of 2,600–4,900 metres (8,500–16,100 feet). This species has the highest known elevation treeline in the northern hemisphere.

The highest known stand of J. tibetica was found at 29°42' N 96°45' E at 4900 m in southeastern Tibet (Xizang Autonomous Region, Baxoi County).

It is an evergreen coniferous shrub or small to medium-sized tree growing to heights of 5–15 m (16–49 ft), rarely 30 metres (98 ft), with a trunk up to 2 metres (6 1/2 ft) in diameter. The leaves are of two forms, juvenile needle-like leaves 5 millimetres (1/4 inch) long on seedlings and occasionally (regrowth after browsing damage) on adult plants, and adult scale-leaves 1.5–3 mm (1/16–1/8 in) long on older plants; they are arranged in decussate opposite pairs or whorls of three. The cones are ovoid, berry-like, 9–16 mm (3/8–5/8 in) long and 7–13 mm (1/4–1/2 in) diameter, blue-black, and contain a single seed; they are mature in about 18 months. The male cones are 1.5–2 mm (1/16–3/32 in) long, and shed their pollen in spring. It is usually monoecious (male and female cones on the same plant), but occasionally dioecious (male and female cones on separate plants).

== Conservation and uses ==
It is the only woody plant occurring over large areas of high altitude Tibet, and grows very slowly in the harsh climatic conditions there. The wood is therefore of major importance to local communities for building construction and fuel, and is also burnt for incense. The foliage is also heavily browsed by domestic goats and other livestock. Both uses have resulted in a significant decline in the species' abundance; formerly listed (1998) as not threatened, it has more recently (2005) been re-categorised as Near Threatened.
