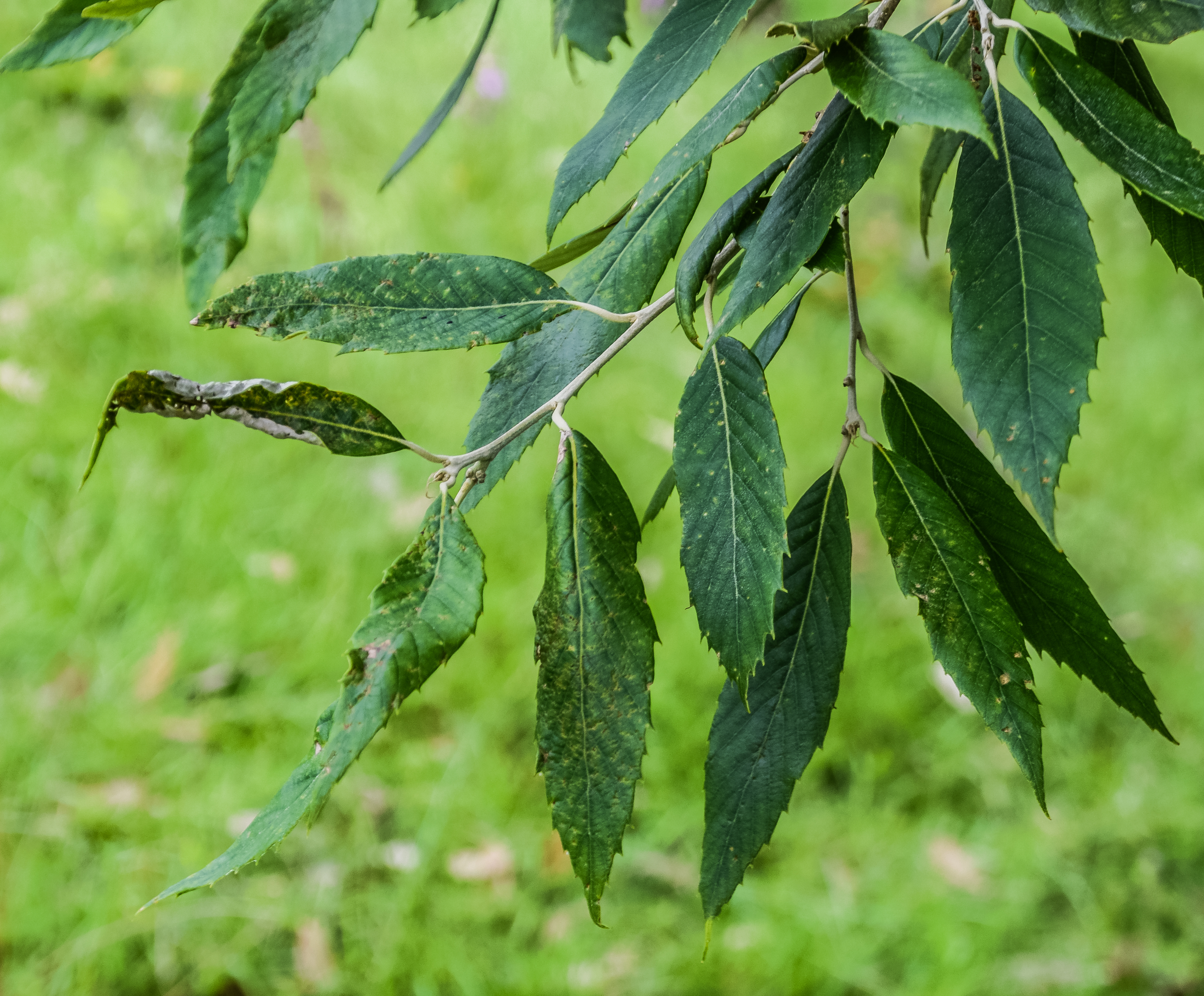
- In cultivation (as Quercus oblongata)

Conservation status
- Least Concern (IUCN 3.1)

Scientific classification
- Kingdom: Plantae
- Clade: Embryophytes
- Clade: Tracheophytes
- Clade: Spermatophytes
- Clade: Angiosperms
- Clade: Eudicots
- Clade: Rosids
- Order: Fagales
- Family: Fagaceae
- Genus: Quercus
- Subgenus: Quercus subg. Cerris
- Section: Quercus sect. Ilex
- Species: Q. lanata

Binomial name
- Quercus lanata Sm.

Subspecies
- Quercus lanata subsp. lanata; Quercus lanata subsp. leiocarpa (A.Camus) Menitsky

Synonyms
- Quercus lanata var. eriocarpa A.Camus; synonyms of subspecies lanata: Quercus banga Buch.-Ham. ex D.Don; Quercus banga Ham. ex Hook.f., in syn.; Quercus lanuginosa D.Don, nom. illeg.; Quercus lanuginosa subsp. eulanuginosa A.Camus; Quercus nepaulensis Desf.; Quercus oblongata D.Don; synonyms of subspecies leiocarpa: Quercus lanata var. leiocarpa A.Camus

= Quercus lanata =

Woolly-leaved oak

Species of oak tree

Quercus lanata, the woolly-leaved oak, is a species of Quercus native to southern and southeastern Asia, including the Himalayas of India (from eastern Uttarakhand to Arunachal Pradesh), Bhutan, Nepal, and Tibet, Sri Lanka, Indochina (Myanmar, northern Thailand, and Vietnam), and southwestern China (Guangxi, Sichuan, and Yunnan). It is a large evergreen tree up to 30 metres (100 feet) tall. The leaves are thick and leathery, green on top but covered in thick wool on the underside. It is classified in subgenus Cerris, section Ilex.

This oak tree grows up to 20 m tall, and under the synonym Quercus oblongata has been recorded from Vietnam, where it may be called sồi bạc or sồi bạch mao.

== Subspecies ==
Two subspecies are recognized by Plants of the World Online as of July 2026:

- Quercus lanata subsp. lanata, synonyms including Quercus oblongata – throughout the range of the species
- Quercus lanata subsp. leiocarpa (A.Camus) Menitsky – from the Assam region to Indo-China
