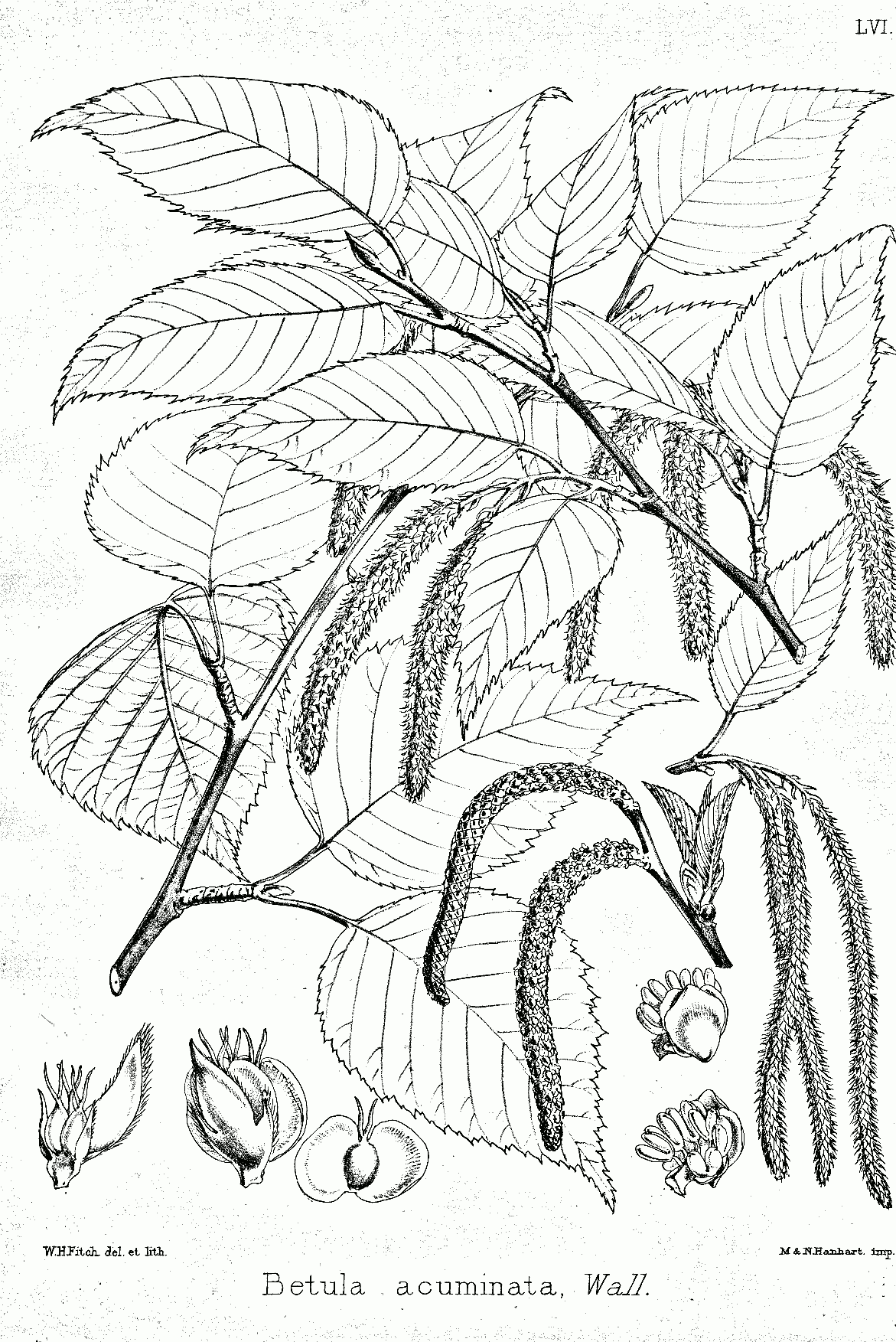

Conservation status
- Least Concern (IUCN 3.1)

Scientific classification
- Kingdom: Plantae
- Clade: Embryophytes
- Clade: Tracheophytes
- Clade: Angiosperms
- Clade: Eudicots
- Clade: Rosids
- Order: Fagales
- Family: Betulaceae
- Genus: Betula
- Subgenus: Betula subg. Betulaster
- Species: B. alnoides

Binomial name
- Betula alnoides Buch.-Ham. ex D.Don

Synonyms
- Betula acuminata Wall.

= Betula alnoides =

Species of birch

Betula alnoides (Chinese: 西桦; pinyin: xi hua; Thai: กำลังเสือโคร่ง, RTGS: kamlang suea khrong, literally: "tiger power") is a species of birch that is native to countries including Bangladesh, Bhutan, Cambodia, China, India, Laos, Myanmar, Nepal, Thailand and Vietnam, at elevations of 300–2,100 m (1,000–7,000 ft) and higher in some cases (up to 2,700 m (9,000 ft)). It is the southernmost of all known birch species, whose natural range reaches approximately 12° N in Cardamom Mountains, Cambodia.

== Description ==
The plant is 30 metres (98 ft) tall with white coloured branches. It has 1.5–3 centimetres (0.59–1.18 in) long petioles and has a 2.5–5.5 centimetres (0.98–2.17 in) long leaf blade that is lanceolate, ovate, papery, and even elliptic. The female inflorescences is a pendulous and cylindric raceme, that, by time it matures, reaches a diameter of 5–10 centimetres (2.0–3.9 in) by 4–6 millimetres (0.16–0.24 in). The peduncle is 2–3 millimetres (0.079–0.118 in) long while the diameter of the bracts is only 3 millimetres (0.12 in). The seeds are ripe from March to May and are 1.5–2 millimetres (0.059–0.079 in) long while the flowers bloom from October to January.

== Uses ==
Betula alnoides inner bark is edible and is used for making cakes and bread. It is also considered to be an antidote against snakebites and is used to treat dislocated bones.

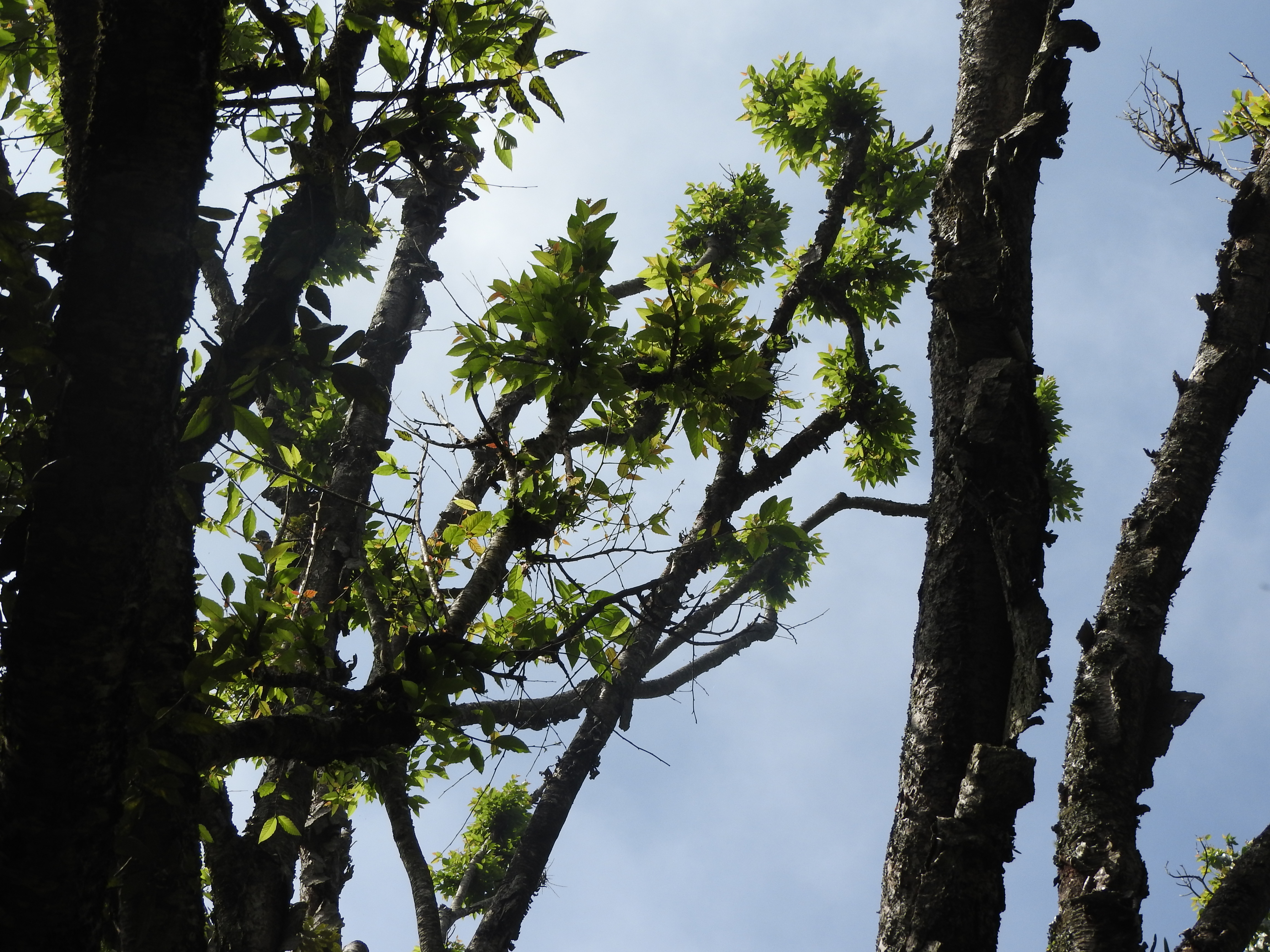
Betula alnoides in Sim's Park, Coonoor (cultivated).
