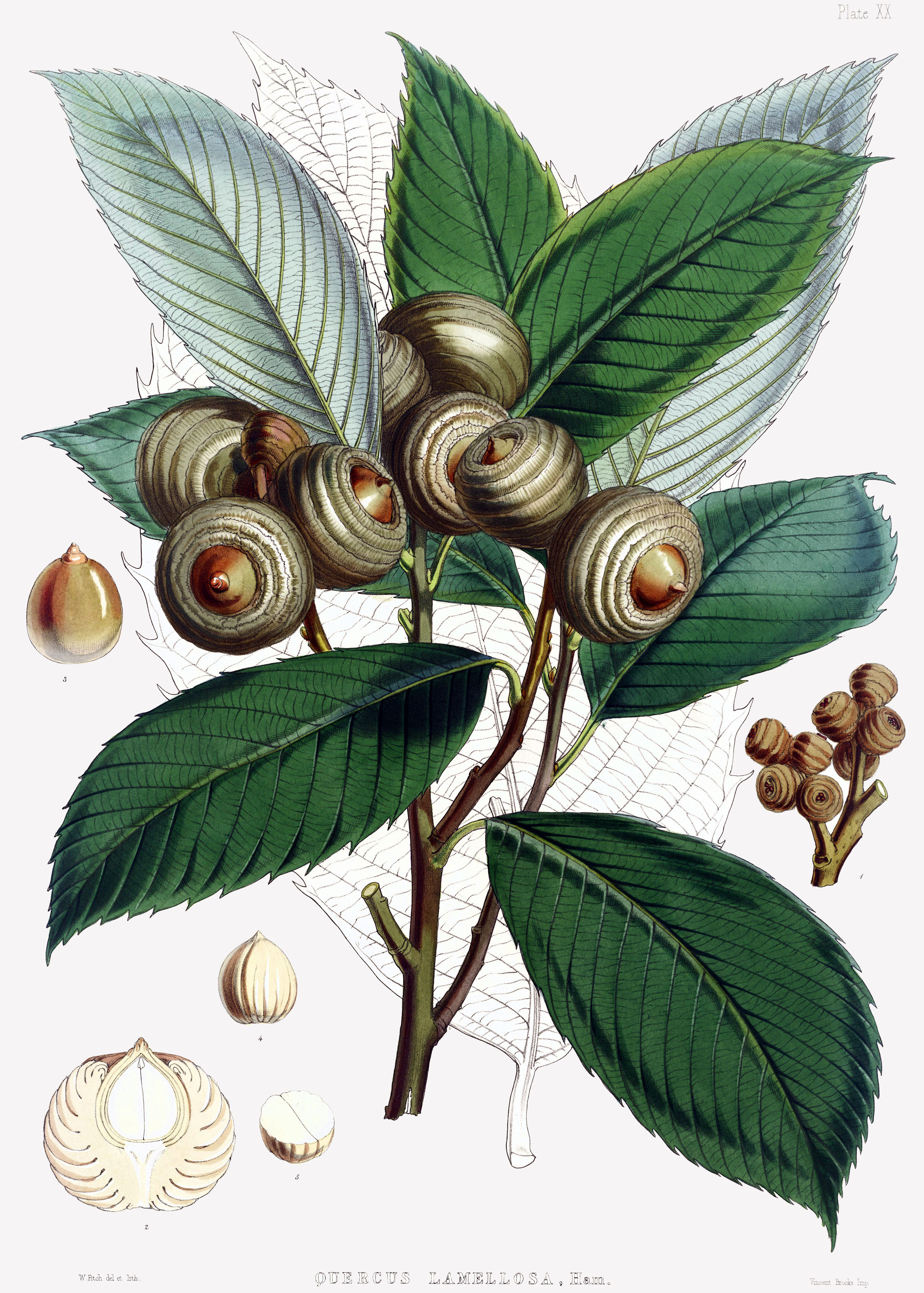
- 1855 illustration

Conservation status
- Near Threatened (IUCN 3.1)

Scientific classification
- Kingdom: Plantae
- Clade: Embryophytes
- Clade: Tracheophytes
- Clade: Spermatophytes
- Clade: Angiosperms
- Clade: Eudicots
- Clade: Rosids
- Order: Fagales
- Family: Fagaceae
- Genus: Quercus
- Subgenus: Quercus subg. Cerris
- Section: Quercus sect. Cyclobalanopsis
- Species: Q. lamellosa

Binomial name
- Quercus lamellosa Sm. (1814)

Synonyms
- List: Cyclobalanopsis fengii Hu & W.C.Cheng; Cyclobalanopsis lamelloides (C.C.Huang) Y.T.Chang; Cyclobalanopsis lamellosa (Sm.) Oerst.; Cyclobalanopsis lamellosa var. nigrinervis (Hu) Z.K.Zhou & H.Sun; Cyclobalanopsis nigrinervis Hu; Cyclobalanopsis paucilamellosa (A.DC.) Oerst.; Dryopsila aprica Raf.; Perytis lamellosa (Sm.) Raf.; Quercus imbricata Buch.-Ham. ex D.Don; Quercus lamellata Roxb.; Quercus lamelloides C.C.Huang; Quercus lamellosa var. nigrinervis (Hu) Z.K.Zhou & H.Sun; Quercus paucilamellosa A.DC.

= Quercus lamellosa =

Species of tree

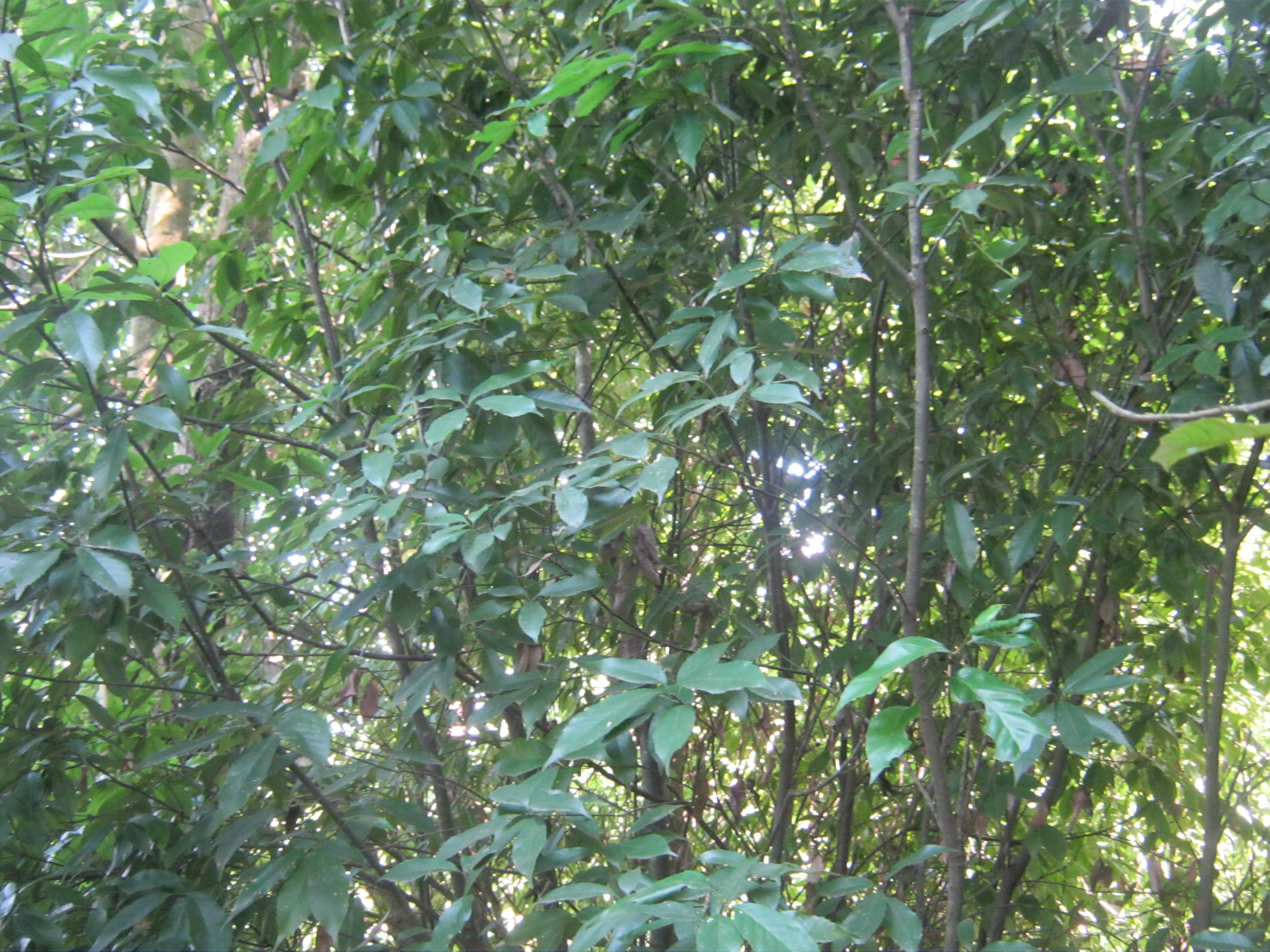
Quercus lamellosa in the jungle of Panchkhal VDC, Nepal

Quercus lamellosa (syn. Cyclobalanopsis lamellosa) is a species of oak (Quercus) native to the Himalaya and adjoining mountains from Tibet and Nepal east as far as Guangxi and northern Thailand, growing at altitudes of 1300–2500 m. The Lepcha of Sikkim call it book koong. It is placed in subgenus Cerris, section Cyclobalanopsis.

Quercus lamellosa is a medium-sized to large evergreen tree growing to 40 m tall with a trunk up to 1.5 m diameter. The leaves are spirally arranged, ovate-elliptic, 16–45 cm long and 6–15 cm broad, with a sharply serrated margin. The flowers are catkins, the female flowers maturing into broad acorns 2–3 cm long and 3–4 cm broad, set in a deep cupule with concentric rings of woody scales.

Joseph Dalton Hooker commented,

"The present is one of the commonest trees about Dorjiling, and is certainly by far the noblest species of Oak known, whether from the size of the foliage or acorns, the texture and colour, or the imposing appearance of the tree."

Quercus lamellosa is occasionally cultivated as an ornamental tree in warm-temperate climates; in the British Isles, cultivation is only successful in the milder parts of Ireland and Cornwall.
