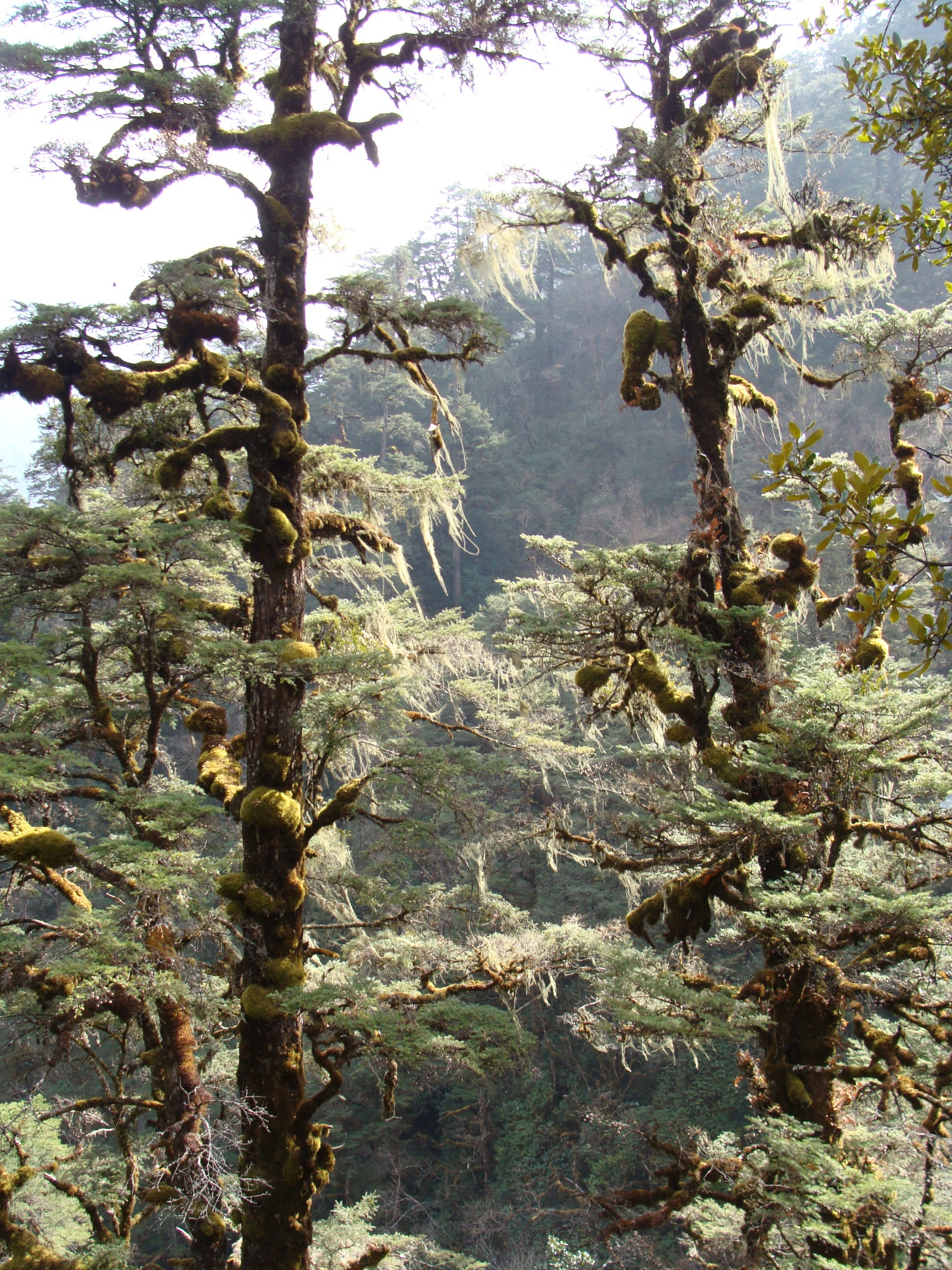

Conservation status
- Least Concern (IUCN 3.1)

Scientific classification
- Kingdom: Plantae
- Clade: Tracheophytes
- Clade: Gymnosperms
- Division: Pinophyta
- Class: Pinopsida
- Order: Pinales
- Family: Pinaceae
- Genus: Tsuga
- Species: T. dumosa

Binomial name
- Tsuga dumosa (D. Don) Eichler

Synonyms
- T. brunoniana (Wall.) Carrière

= Tsuga dumosa =

Himalayan hemlock

Species of conifer

Tsuga dumosa, commonly called the Himalayan hemlock or in Chinese, Yunnan tieshan (simplified Chinese: 云南铁杉; traditional Chinese: 雲南鐵杉; pinyin: Yúnnán tiěshān), is a species of conifer in the pine family, Pinaceae, native to the eastern Himalayas. It occurs in parts of Nepal, India, Bhutan, Myanmar, Vietnam and Tibet. Within its native range the tree is used for construction as well as for furniture. In Europe and North America, it is occasionally encountered as an ornamental species and was first brought to the United Kingdom in 1838.

== Description ==
Tsuga dumosa is a tree growing 20 to 25 m (65 to 80 feet) high and exceptionally to 40 m (130 feet). The diameter at breast height is typically 40 to 50 cm (16 to 20 inches), but can be beyond 100 cm (40 inches). The crown on small trees is ovoid and their form is like that of pendulous bushes. Older trees tend to have multiple stems from one or two sinuous boles, especially in cultivation. The crown of mature trees is broad, irregular-pyramidal and open. The bark is a similar to that of an old larch: somewhat pinkish to grey-brown and heavily ridged with broad, shallow, flaky fissures. The branches are oblique or horizontal. The twigs are reddish brown or greyish yellow in their first year and are pubescent, i.e. covered with short hairs. Branches that are 2 to 3 years old are greyish brown or dark grey with leaf scars. The wood from the tree is a brownish yellow with a fine structure and straight veins.

The leaves are spirally arranged, pointing forward on the branches and placed distantly from one another compared to other species in the genus Tsuga. They are linear in shape, and 10 to 25 mm (0.5 to 1 inch) long by 2 to 2.5 mm (0.08 to 0.10 inches) wide. The ends are obtuse or rounded, and very occasionally emarginate. The upper surface of the leaves is green and shiny, while the undersides have 2 wide silvery stomatal bands. The upper half of the leaves usually have small dents on the margins, i.e. the margins are rarely entire. The midrib is concave on the upper surface.

The male cones are globose in shape, solitarily arranged and axillary. The female cones are round-ovate in shape, also solitarily arranged, terminal and slightly down-curved. They have many spiral scales with 2 ovules contained within each scale. The seeds are about 9 mm (0.4 inches) long, ovate in shape, brown in colour and have thin wings in their upper parts. Cone production occurs from April to May and seed maturation from October to November.

== Range and habitat ==
Tsuga dumosa is generally associated with the Himalayas. In India, it occurs from Uttarakhand in the west and Arunachal Pradesh in the east. It is evident in the Himalayan region of Nepal. The range continues southeast to northern Myanmar and Vietnam, and northeast to southeastern Tibet, northwestern Yunnan and southwestern Sichuan. In Vietnam it is only found at altitudes above 1,500 m (5,000 feet) on Hoang Lien Son Mountain. In that country it is usually mixed with Rhododendron spp. and Abies pindrow, though it can sometimes form a pure stand. It is adapted to areas with a cold climate and high rainfall and high humidity.
