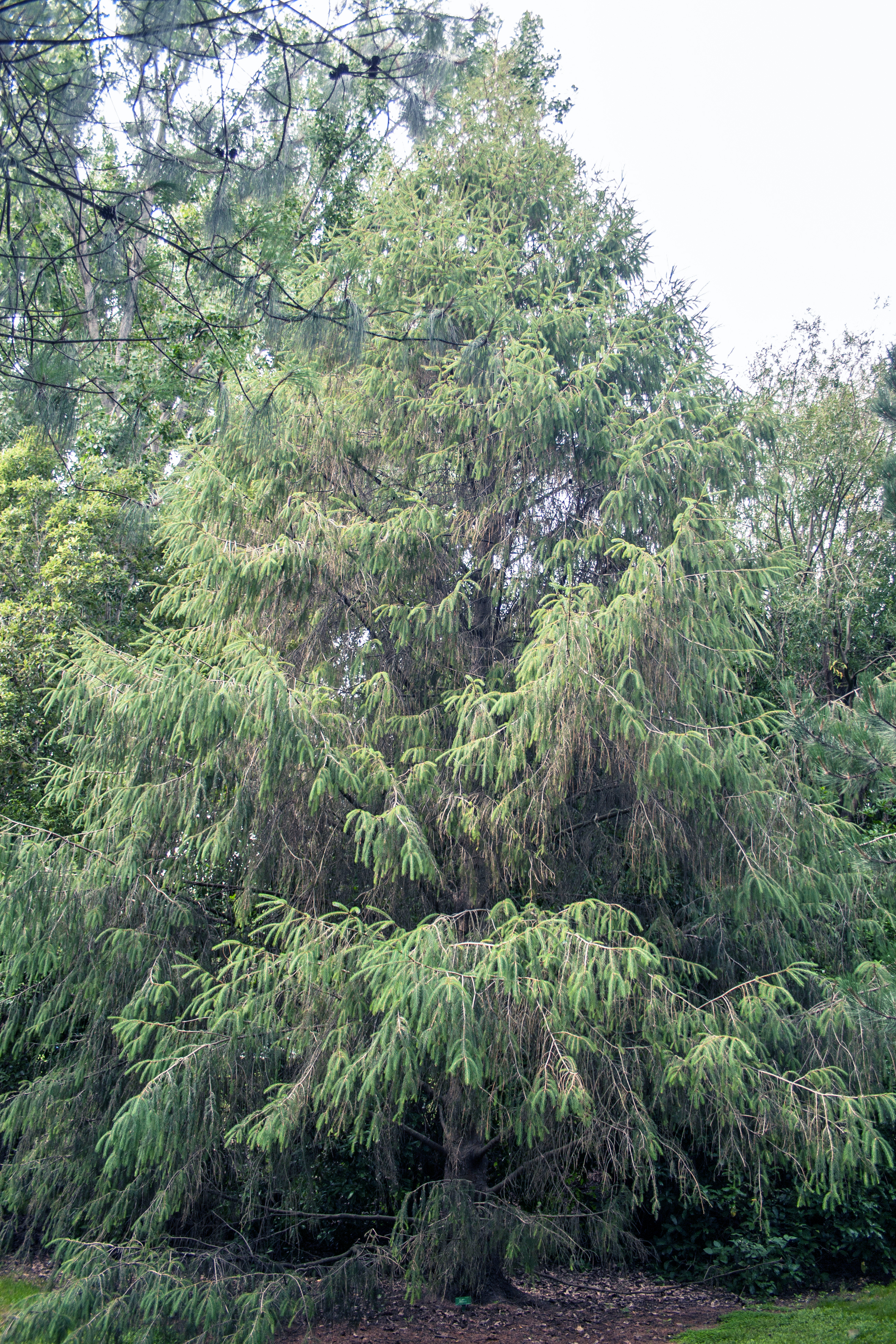
- In cultivation

Conservation status
- Vulnerable (IUCN 3.1)

Scientific classification
- Kingdom: Plantae
- Clade: Tracheophytes
- Clade: Gymnospermae
- Division: Pinophyta
- Class: Pinopsida
- Order: Pinales
- Family: Pinaceae
- Genus: Picea
- Species: P. brachytyla

Binomial name
- Picea brachytyla (Franch.) E.Pritz.

= Picea brachytyla =

Species of conifer

Picea brachytyla or Sargent's spruce is a species of conifer in the family Pinaceae. It is found in China, Myanmar, Arunachal Pradesh in India, and possibly in Bhutan. It is threatened by habitat loss.
