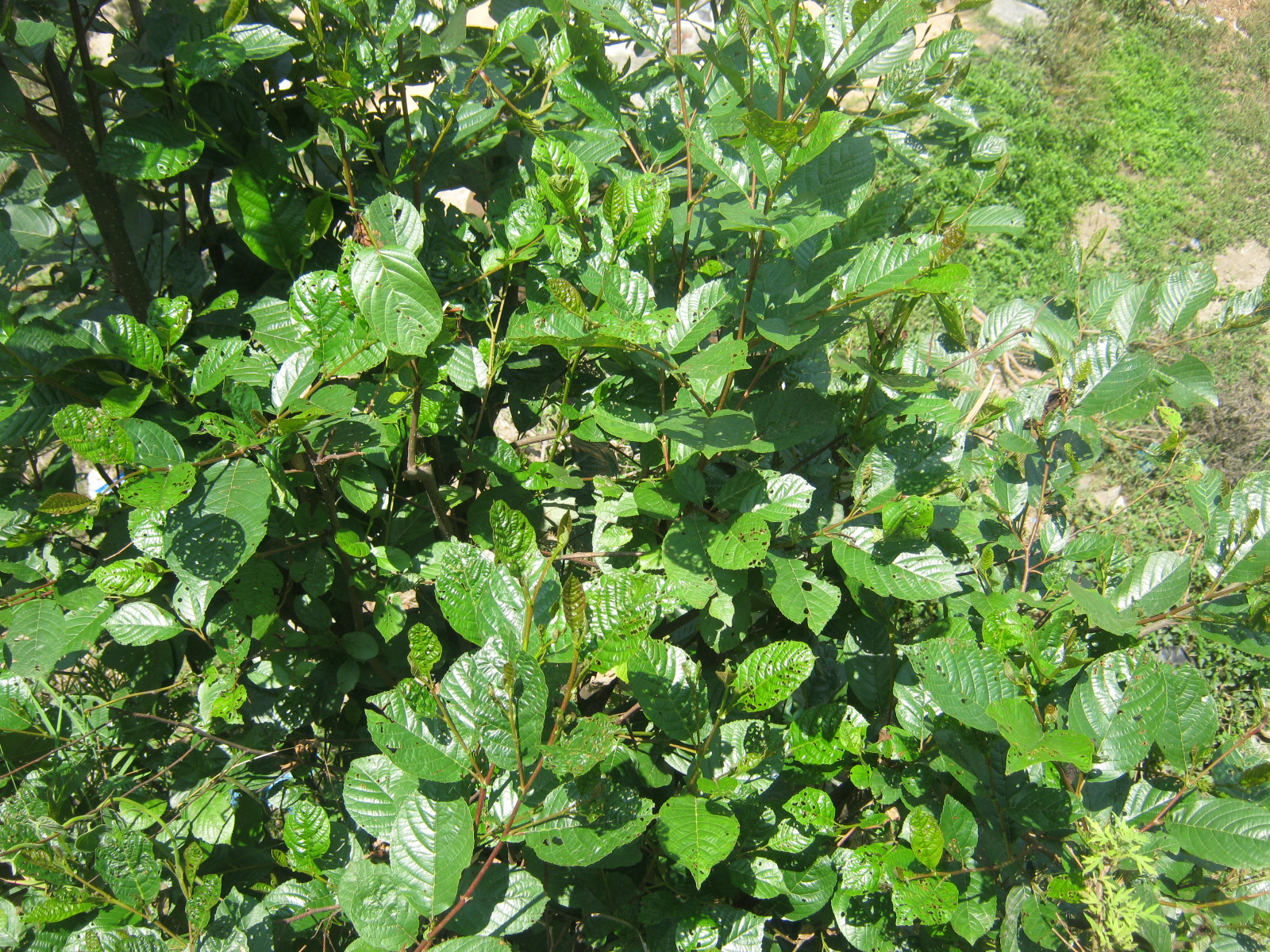
- In Panchkhal valley in Nepal

Conservation status
- Least Concern (IUCN 3.1)

Scientific classification
- Kingdom: Plantae
- Clade: Embryophytes
- Clade: Tracheophytes
- Clade: Angiosperms
- Clade: Eudicots
- Clade: Rosids
- Order: Fagales
- Family: Betulaceae
- Genus: Alnus
- Subgenus: Alnus subg. Alnus
- Species: A. nepalensis

Binomial name
- Alnus nepalensis D.Don

= Alnus nepalensis =

Species of plant

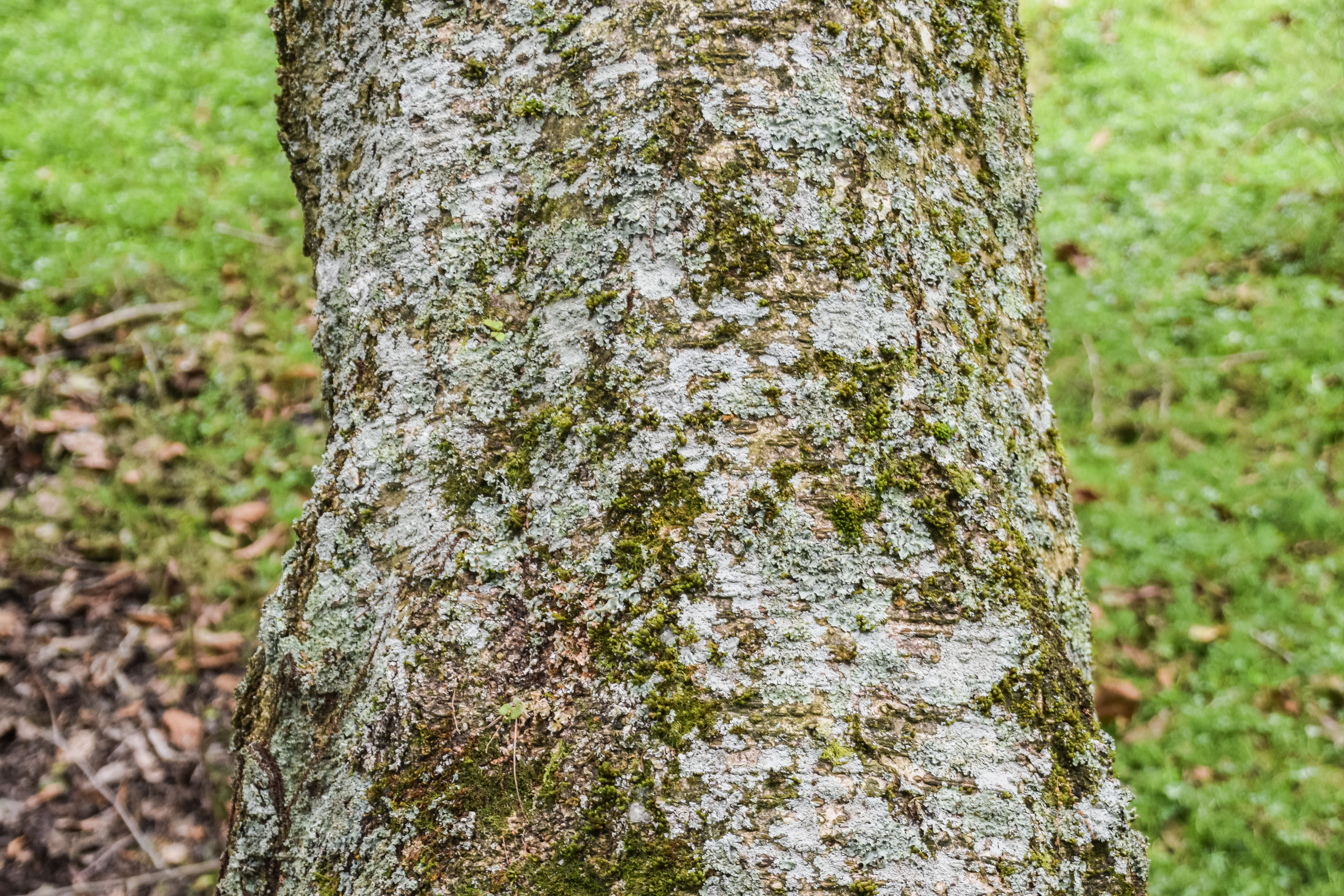
Bark of Alnus nepalensis

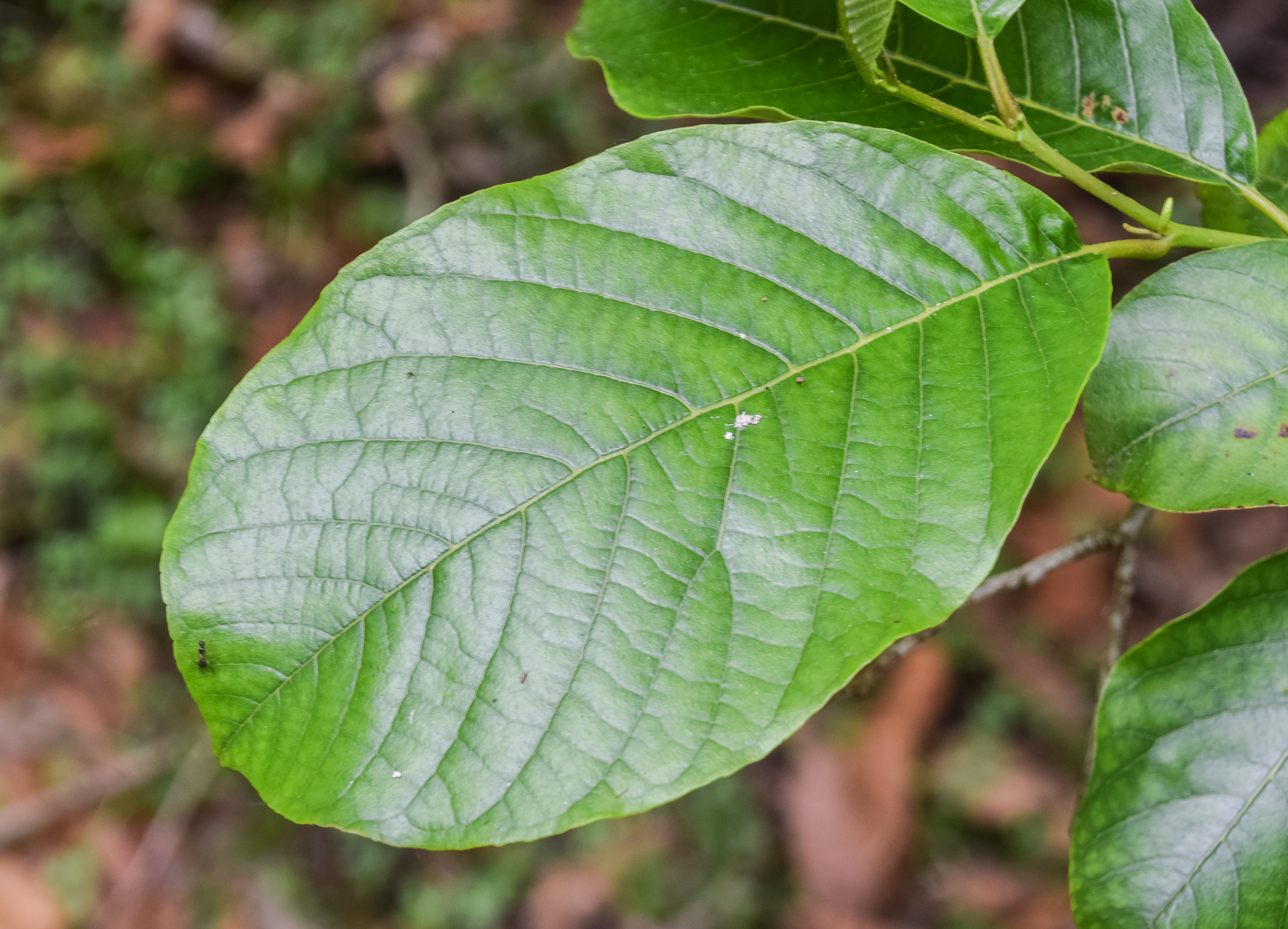
Leaf of Alnus nepalensis

Alnus nepalensis is a large alder tree found in the subtropical highlands of the Himalayas. The tree is called Utis in Nepali and Nepalese alder in English. It is used in land reclamation, as firewood and for making charcoal.

== Description ==
Alnus nepalensis is a large deciduous alder with silver-gray bark that reaches up to 30 m in height and 60 cm in diameter. The leaves are alternate, simple, shallowly toothed, with prominent veins parallel to each other, 7–16 cm long and 5–10 cm broad. The flowers are catkins, with the male and female flowers separate but produced on the same tree. The male flowers are 10 to 25 cm (4 to 10 in) long and pendulous, while the female flowers are erect, 1 to 2 cm (0.4 to 0.8 in), with up to eight together in axillary racemes. Unusually for an alder, they are produced in the autumn, with the seeds maturing the following year.

== Distribution ==
It occurs throughout the Himalaya at 500–3000 m of elevation from Pakistan through India, Nepal and Bhutan to Yunnan in southwest China. It grows best on deep volcanic loamy soils, but also grows on clay, sand and gravel. It tolerates a wide variety of soil types and grows well in very wet areas. It needs plenty of moisture in the soil and prefers streamside locations, but also grows on slopes.

== Uses ==
The tree grows quickly and is sometimes planted as erosion control on hillsides and for land recovery in shifting cultivation. It has nodules on the roots which fix nitrogen. The wood is moderately soft. It is occasionally used for making boxes and in light construction but is mainly used as firewood, when it burns evenly but rather rapidly, and for making charcoal. Currently, this tree species is preferred by different indigenous ethnic groups such as H'mong, Nung and Thu Lao in Simacai district, Lao Cai province, Northern Vietnam to regreen and enrich the forest by local knowledge (SPERI, CENDI).
