= Eastern Himalayan alpine shrub and meadows =

Ecoregion in the Eastern Himalayas

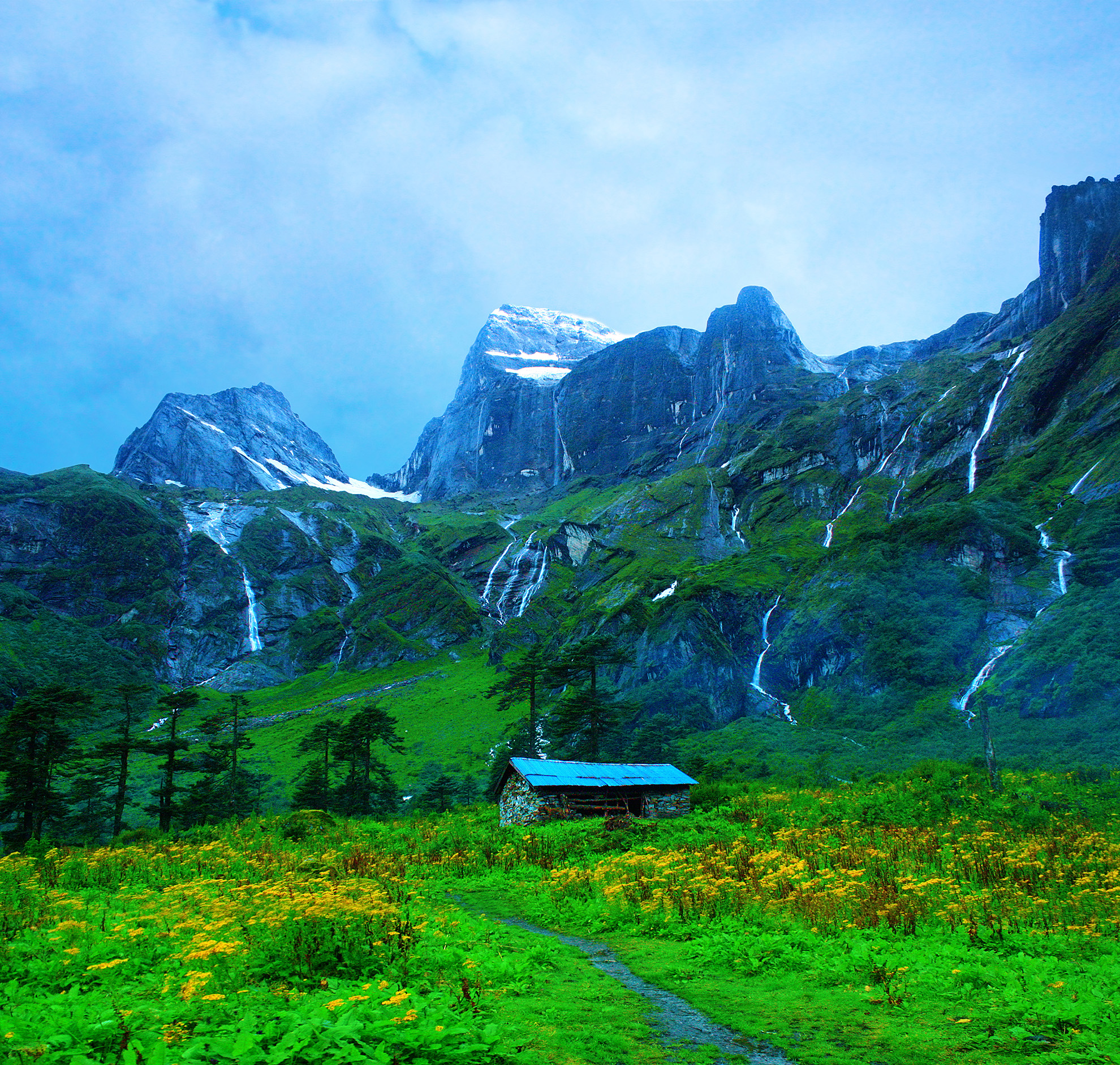
- Eastern Himalayan alpine shrub and meadows in the Barun Valley of Nepal

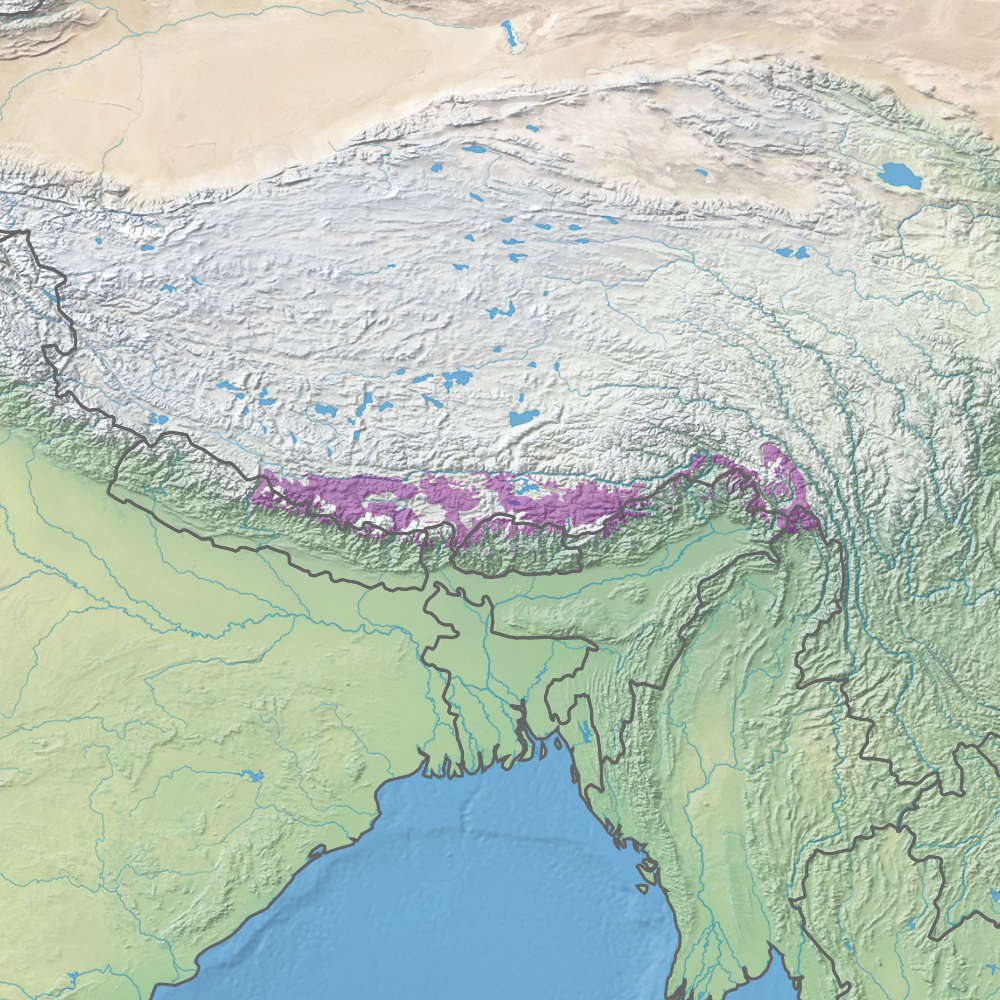
- Ecoregion territory (in purple)

Ecology
- Biome: Montane grasslands and shrublands
- Borders: List: Yarlung Tsangpo arid steppe; Central Tibetan Plateau alpine steppe; Northeastern Himalayan subalpine conifer forests; Eastern Himalayan subalpine conifer forests; Nujiang Lancang Gorge alpine conifer and mixed forests; Northern Triangle temperate forests; Eastern Himalayan broadleaf forests; Western Himalayan alpine shrub and meadows
- Bird species: 496
- Mammal species: 117

Geography
- Area: 121,200 km^{2} (46,800 sq mi)
- Countries: List: Bhutan; China; India; Myanmar; Nepal

Conservation
- Habitat loss: 9.2095%
- Protected: 32.9%

The Eastern Himalayan alpine shrub and meadows is a montane grasslands and shrublands ecoregion of Bhutan, China, India, Myanmar, and Nepal, which lies between the tree line and snow line in the eastern portion of the Himalaya Range.

== Setting ==
The Eastern Himalayan alpine shrub and meadows covers an area of 121,300 square kilometres (46,800 sq mi), extending along the north and south faces of the Himalaya Range from the Kali Gandaki Gorge in central Nepal eastwards through Tibet and India's Sikkim state, Bhutan, India's Arunachal Pradesh state, and northernmost Myanmar.

The alpine shrub and meadows lie between approximately 4,000 and 5,500 metres (13,100 and 18,000 ft) elevation. Permanent ice and snow lies above 5,500 metres (18,000 ft). The Eastern Himalayan subalpine conifer forests lie below 3,000 metres (9,800 ft) along the southern slopes of the range, from Central Nepal to Bhutan. The Northeastern Himalayan subalpine conifer forests lie south of the range in Arunachal Pradesh, extending north of the range into the lower valley of the Brahmaputra River and its tributaries. The Northern Triangle temperate forests lie to the south of the alpine shrub and meadows in northern Myanmar, and the Nujiang Lancang Gorge alpine conifer and mixed forests lie to the east in the gorges of the upper Irrawaddy and Salween rivers.

The Yarlung Tsangpo arid steppe lies in the upper Brahmaputra Valley of Tibet, north of the Eastern Himalayan alpine shrub and meadows.

== Flora ==
Alpine shrublands, characterized by rhododendrons, predominate at lower elevations, close to the treeline. The rhododendron flora of the ecoregion is quite varied, with species composition changing as one moves from west to east along the range. Typical species include Rhododendron wightii, R. fulgens, R. thomsonii, R. hodgsonii, R. lanatum, and R. campanulatum. The shrubs form a krummholz or stunted forest of low, dense, twisted woody plants.

Above the shrublands are alpine meadows which support a variety of herbaceous plants, including species of Alchemilla, Androsace, Anemone, Diapensia, Draba, Gentiana, Impatiens, Leontopodium, Meconopsis, Pedicularis, Potentilla, Primula, Rhododendron, Saussurea, Saxifraga, Sedum, and Viola. In the spring and summer, the alpine meadows are covered with brightly colored flowers.

On the upper slopes, low grasses and cushion plants grow among the boulders and scree.

== Fauna ==
Large mammals include the snow leopard (Uncia uncia), bharal or Himalayan blue sheep (Pseudois nayaur), Himalayan tahr (Hemitragus jemlahicus), takin (Budorcas taxicolor), Himalayan musk deer (Moschus chrysogaster), Himalayan goral (Nemorhaedus baileyi), and Himalayan serow (Capricornis thar). Smaller mammals include Himalayan marmots (Marmota himalayana), weasels, and pikas.

Native birds of the alpine shrubland or krummholz zone include the blood pheasant (Ithaginis cruentus), satyr tragopan (Tragopan satyra), Himalayan monal (Lophophorus impejanus), and hill partridge (Arborophila torqueola).

== Conservation ==
Several protected areas lie within or partly within the ecoregion, including:

- Valley of Flowers National Park, India
- Annapurna Conservation Area, Nepal
- Bumdeling Wildlife Sanctuary, Bhutan
- Dihang-Dibang Biosphere Reserve, India
- Dongjiu Nature Reserve, China
- Jigme Singye Wangchuck National Park, Bhutan
- Jigme Dorji National Park, Bhutan
- Langtang National Park, Nepal
- Makalu-Barun National Park and Conservation Area, Nepal
- Motuo Nature Reserve, China
- Sakteng Wildlife Sanctuary, Bhutan
- Sagarmatha National Park, Nepal
- Thrumshingla National Park, Bhutan
- Torsa Strict Nature Reserve, Bhutan
- Walong National Park, India
- Nanda Devi National Park, India

== See also ==
- List of ecoregions in India
