= Biogeographic classification of India =

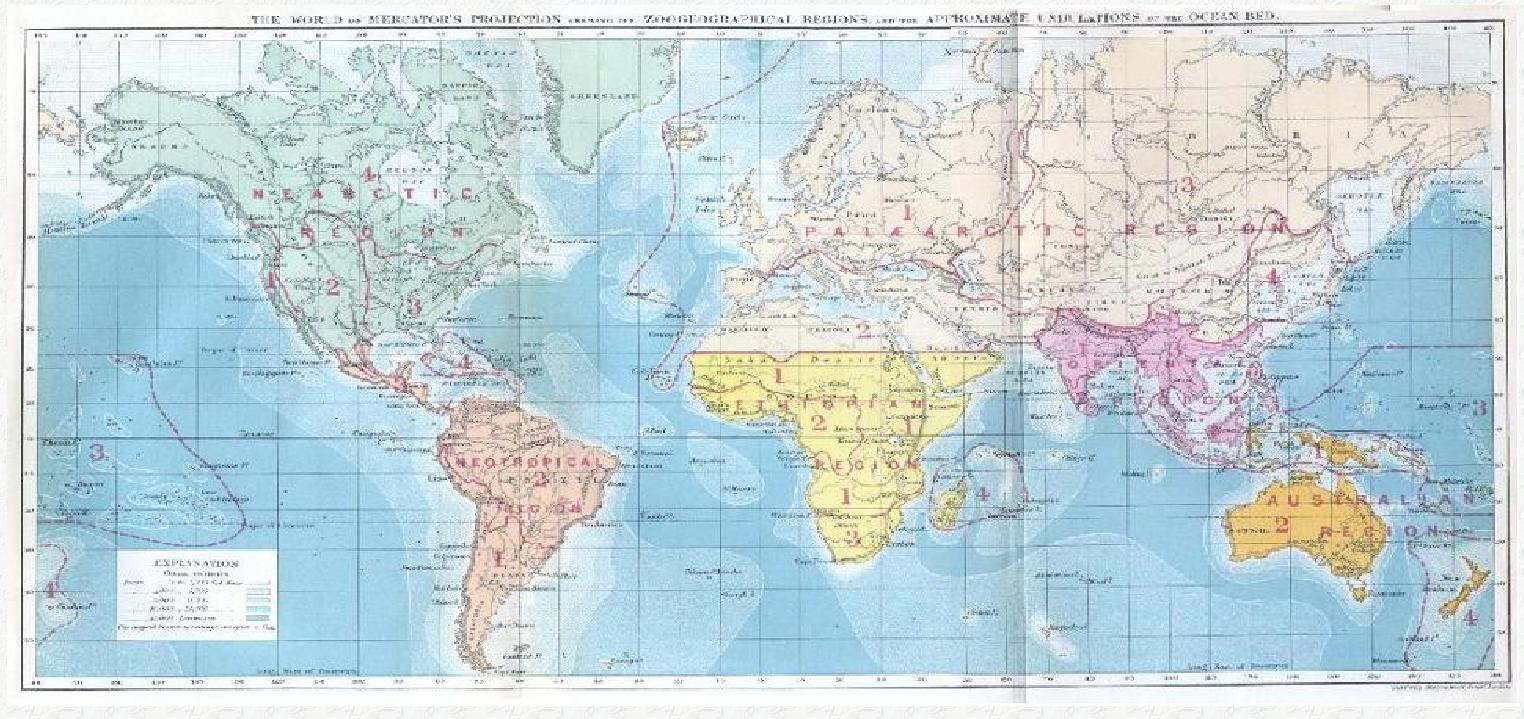
Frontispiece to Alfred Russel Wallace's book The Geographical Distribution of Animals

Biogeographic classification of India is the division of India according to biogeographic characteristics. Biogeography is the study of the distribution of species (biology), organisms, and ecosystems in geographic space and through geological time. India has a rich heritage of natural diversity. India ranks fourth in Asia and tenth in the world amongst the top 17 mega-diverse countries in the world. India harbours nearly 11% of the world's floral diversity comprising over 17500 documented flowering plants, 6200 endemic species, 7500 medicinal plants and 246 globally threatened species in only 2.4% of world's land area. India is also home to four biodiversity hotspots—Andaman & Nicobar Islands, Eastern Himalaya, Indo-Burma region, and the Western Ghats. Hence the importance of biogeographical study of India's natural heritage.

The first initiative to classify the forests of India was done by Champion in 1936 and revised by Seth in 1968. This was followed by pioneering work on India's biogeography by MS Mani in 1974. Numerous schemes divide India into biogeographic regions as part of global schemes based on varying parameters, e.g. the Global 200 scheme of the Worldwide Fund for Nature. In addition, ongoing research focusing on particular taxa have included biogeographic aspects particular to the taxa under study and the area under consideration.

Rogers and Panwar of the Wildlife Institute of India outlined a scheme to divide India zoogeographically in 1988 while planning a protected area network for India. Similarly the Forest Survey of India has issued an atlas of forest vegetation types in 2011 based on Champion & Seth (1968). However, there is no official scheme mandated by the Government of India, as has been issued by the European Environment Agency in the case of the European Union.

== Biogeographic realms ==
The territory of India falls in two of the 8 biogeographic realms of the world – The Palearctic realm and the Indomalayan realm. Nearctic Palearctic Afrotropic Indomalaya Australasia Neotropic Oceania and Antarctic ecozones not shown.

At the broadest level, referred to as realm in Udvardy (1975), all of India falls in the Indomalayan realm, with the exception of the high Himalayas, which fall in the Palearctic realm.

Most of India falls in the "Indian Subcontinent" bioregion of the Indomalayan realm, which covers most of India, Pakistan, Bangladesh, Nepal, Bhutan, and Sri Lanka. The Hindu Kush, Karakoram, Himalaya, and Patkai ranges bound the bioregion on the northwest, north, and northeast; these ranges were formed by the collision of the northward-drifting Indian subcontinent with Asia beginning 45 million years ago. The Hindu Kush, Karakoram, and Himalaya are a major biogeographic boundary between the subtropical and tropical flora and fauna of the Indian subcontinent and the temperate-climate Palearctic realm.

The Nicobar islands on the other hand fall in the "Sundaland" bioregion of the Indo-Malayan realm.

The Himalayas proper form the southern limit of the Palearctic in South Asia, and here the Palearctic temperate forests transition to the subtropical and tropical forests of Indomalaya, creating a rich and diverse mix of plant and animal species.

== WWF habitat classification ==
Based on Olson et al. (2001), the Worldwide Fund for Nature divided the land area of world into 14 terrestrial biomes or habitat types, based on vegetation, (Note: The WWF defines "bioregions" are defined as: "geographic clusters of ecoregions that may span several habitat types, but have strong biogeographic affinities, particularly at taxonomic levels higher than the species level (genus, family)".) which are further subdivided into a total of 867 terrestrial ecoregions, (Note: The WWF defines an "ecoregion" as: a "large unit of land or water containing a geographically distinct assemblage of species, natural communities, and environmental conditions".) which are exemplars of the concerned biome or habitat type. The classification also includes seven fresh-water biomes and 5 marine biomes. Each biome contains many ecoregions that are examples of that type of habitat. The purpose of this classification scheme is to identify ecoregions that are conservation priorities. These priority regions are referred to collectively as the WWF's Global 200.

Only two terrestrial ecoregions from India – the Western Ghats and the Eastern Himalayas – figure in the Global 200 priority list of the WWF.

=== Terrestrial biomes of India ===
The following 11 terrestrial biomes are found in India:

Indomalayan realm

- Tropical and subtropical moist broadleaf forests
- Tropical and subtropical dry broadleaf forests
- Tropical and subtropical coniferous forests
- Temperate broadleaf and mixed forests
- Temperate coniferous forests
- Tropical and subtropical grasslands, savannas, and shrublands
- Flooded grasslands and savannas
- Mangroves
- Deserts and xeric shrublands

Palearctic realm

- Temperate coniferous forests
- Montane grasslands and shrublands

=== Ecoregions of India ===
The ecoregions of India, with details of states/union territories they occur in, and the concerned biome and realm are given in the table below.

Ecoregion	State(s) or UT(s)	Biome	realm
Andaman Islands rain forests	Andaman and Nicobar Islands	Tropical and subtropical moist broadleaf forests	Indomalayan
Brahmaputra Valley semi-evergreen forests	Arunachal Pradesh, Assam, Meghalaya, Nagaland	Tropical and subtropical moist broadleaf forests	Indomalayan
Eastern highlands moist deciduous forests	Andhra Pradesh, Chhattisgarh, Jharkhand, Madhya Pradesh, Maharashtra, Odisha, Telangana, West Bengal	Tropical and subtropical moist broadleaf forests	Indomalayan
Himalayan subtropical broadleaf forests	Bihar, Sikkim, Uttar Pradesh, Uttarakhand, West Bengal	Tropical and subtropical moist broadleaf forests	Indomalayan
Lower Gangetic Plains moist deciduous forests	Assam, Bihar, Jharkhand, Madhya Pradesh, Odisha, Tripura, Uttar Pradesh, West Bengal,	Tropical and subtropical moist broadleaf forests	Indomalayan
Malabar Coast moist forests	Goa, Karnataka, Kerala, Maharashtra, Tamil Nadu,	Tropical and subtropical moist broadleaf forests	Indomalayan
Maldives-Lakshadweep-Chagos Archipelago tropical moist forests	Lakshadweep	Tropical and subtropical moist broadleaf forests	Indomalayan
Meghalaya subtropical forests	Assam, Meghalaya, Nagaland, Tripura	Tropical and subtropical moist broadleaf forests	Indomalayan
Mizoram-Manipur-Kachin rain forests	Assam, Manipur, Mizoram, Nagaland, Tripura	Tropical and subtropical moist broadleaf forests	Indomalayan
Nicobar Islands rain forests	Andaman and Nicobar Islands, Goa, Gujarat, Karnataka, Maharashtra,	Tropical and subtropical moist broadleaf forests	Indomalayan
North Western Ghats moist deciduous forests	Dadra and Nagar Haveli and Daman and Diu	Tropical and subtropical moist broadleaf forests	Indomalayan
North Western Ghats montane rain forests	Goa, Gujarat, Karnataka, Maharashtra,	Tropical and subtropical moist broadleaf forests	Indomalayan
Odisha semi-evergreen forests	Andhra Pradesh, Odisha	Tropical and subtropical moist broadleaf forests	Indomalayan
South Western Ghats moist deciduous forests	Karnataka, Kerala, Tamil Nadu	Tropical and subtropical moist broadleaf forests	Indomalayan
South Western Ghats montane rain forests	Karnataka, Kerala, Tamil Nadu,	Tropical and subtropical moist broadleaf forests	Indomalayan
Sundarbans freshwater swamp forests	West Bengal	Tropical and subtropical moist broadleaf forests	Indomalayan
Upper Gangetic Plains moist deciduous forests	Bihar, Delhi, Haryana, Himachal Pradesh, Madhya Pradesh, Rajasthan, Uttar Pradesh, Uttarakhand	Tropical and subtropical moist broadleaf forests	Indomalayan
Central Deccan Plateau dry deciduous forests	Andhra Pradesh, Chhattisgarh, Karnataka, Madhya Pradesh, Maharashtra, Telangana	Tropical and subtropical dry broadleaf forests	Indomalayan
Chota Nagpur dry deciduous forests	Bihar, Chhattisgarh, Jharkhand, Madhya Pradesh, Odisha, Uttar Pradesh, West Bengal	Tropical and subtropical dry broadleaf forests	Indomalayan
East Deccan dry evergreen forests	Andhra Pradesh, Puducherry, Tamil Nadu, Dadra and Nagar Haveli and Daman and Diu, Gujarat, Haryana, Madhya Pradesh, Maharashtra, Rajasthan, Uttar Pradesh	Tropical and subtropical dry broadleaf forests	Indomalayan
Narmada Valley dry deciduous forests	Chhattisgarh, Gujarat, Karnataka, Madhya Pradesh, Maharashtra, Uttar Pradesh	Tropical and subtropical dry broadleaf forests	Indomalayan
Northern dry deciduous forests	Chhattisgarh, Odisha	Tropical and subtropical dry broadleaf forests	Indomalayan
South Deccan Plateau dry deciduous forests	Karnataka, Tamil Nadu,	Tropical and subtropical dry broadleaf forests	Indomalayan
Himalayan subtropical pine forests	Himachal Pradesh, Jammu and Kashmir, Sikkim, Uttarakhand, West Bengal	Tropical and subtropical coniferous forests	Indomalayan
Northeast India-Myanmar pine forests	Manipur, Nagaland,	Tropical and subtropical coniferous forests	Indomalayan
Eastern Himalayan broadleaf forests	Arunachal Pradesh, Assam, Nagaland, Sikkim, West Bengal	Temperate broadleaf and mixed forests	Indomalayan
Western Himalayan broadleaf forests	Himachal Pradesh, Jammu and Kashmir, Punjab, Uttarakhand	Temperate broadleaf and mixed forests	Indomalayan
Eastern Himalayan subalpine conifer forests	Arunachal Pradesh, Sikkim, West Bengal	Temperate coniferous forests	Indomalayan
Western Himalayan subalpine conifer forests	Jammu and Kashmir, Himachal Pradesh, Ladakh, Uttarakhand	Temperate coniferous forests	Indomalayan
Terai-Duar savanna and grasslands	Assam, Bihar, Uttar Pradesh, Uttarakhand, West Bengal	Tropical and subtropical grasslands, savannas, and shrublands	Indomalayan
Rann of Kutch seasonal salt marsh	Gujarat	Flooded grasslands and savannas	Indomalayan
Deccan thorn scrub forests	Andhra Pradesh, Karnataka, Madhya Pradesh, Maharashtra, Deserts and xeric shrublands, Telangana	Deserts and xeric shrublands	Indomalayan
Northwestern thorn scrub forests	Chandigarh, Delhi, Gujarat, Haryana, Himachal Pradesh, Jammu and Kashmir, Punjab, Rajasthan	Deserts and xeric shrublands	Indomalayan
Thar Desert	Gujarat, Haryana, Rajasthan	Deserts and xeric shrublands	Indomalayan
Godavari-Krishna mangroves	Andhra Pradesh, Odisha, Tamil Nadu,	Mangrove	Indomalayan
Indus River Delta-Arabian Sea mangroves	Dadra and Nagar Haveli and Daman and Diu, Gujarat, Maharashtra,	Mangrove	Indomalayan
Sundarbans mangroves	West Bengal	Mangrove	Indomalayan
Northeastern Himalayan subalpine conifer forests	Arunachal Pradesh	Temperate coniferous forests	Palearctic
Central Tibetan Plateau alpine steppe	Ladakh	Montane grasslands and shrublands	Palearctic
Eastern Himalayan alpine shrub and meadows	Arunachal Pradesh, Sikkim	Montane grasslands and shrublands	Palearctic
Karakoram-West Tibetan Plateau alpine steppe	Ladakh	Montane grasslands and shrublands	Palearctic
Northwestern Himalayan alpine shrub and meadows	Jammu and Kashmir, Himachal Pradesh, Ladakh	Montane grasslands and shrublands	Palearctic
Western Himalayan alpine shrub and meadows	Himachal Pradesh, Uttarakhand	Montane grasslands and shrublands	Palearctic

== ICFRE classification of the Forest types of India ==
The first proper classification of forest types of India was done by Champion in 1936 and revised by S.K. Seth in 1968. It was further revised by Mathur in 2000. Champion and Seth (1968) classified the Indian forest using temperature and rainfall data into five major forest groups and 16 type groups (climatic types) and over 200 subgroup types. Although this classification was widely accepted, as time passed it was found to have certain drawbacks. The purpose of the classification by Champion was primarily forest use, specifically timber extraction. As time passed, the nature of Indian forestry changed to forest conservation, with new emphasis on the increasing role of forests in environment amelioration and climate change mitigation/adaptation. The classification into over 200 subgroups created problems of needless complexity for forest managers.

The Forest Survey of India (FSI), under the aegis of ICFRE, published the Atlas Forest Type of India in 2011. The forest type atlas contained forest type maps for India which were digitised for the first time. The forest type maps were prepared on 1;50,000 scale according to the Champion & Seth classification (1968) of the country and included States and UTs and districts. The output of this mapping exercise covers 178 out of 200 forest types described in the Champion & Seth classification (1968). Ground-proofing, further survey and reclassification actions are intended by the ICFRE to simplify this classification even further.

== Biogeographic zones ==
Rogers and Panwar of the Wildlife Institute of India (WII) outlined a scheme to divide India zoogeographically in 1986 while planning a protected area network for India. The scheme divided India into 10 biogeographic zones, and each zone is further subdivided into biogeographic provinces, which total 27 in number. 1. Trans Himalayan zone. 2. Himalayan zone 3. Desert zone. 4. Semiarid zone. 5. Western ghat zone. 6. Deccan plateau zone. 7. Gangetic plain zone. 8. North east zone. 9. Coastal zone. 10. Islands

Zone 1 – Trans-Himalayan Region

The Himalayan ranges immediately north of the Great Himalayan range are called the Trans-Himalayas. It comprises three biogeographic provinces – Ladakh mountains, Tibetan plateau and Himalayan Sikkim. It accounts for ~5.6% of the country's landmass. This region mostly lies between 4,500 to 6,000 metres (14,800 to 19,700 ft) and is very cold and arid. The only vegetation is a sparse alpine steppe. Extensive areas consist of bare rock and glaciers.

The Trans-Himalayan region with its sparse vegetation has the richest wild sheep and goat community in the world. The snow leopard, black and brown bears, wolf, marmots, marbled cat, ibex, and kiang is found here, as are the migratory Black-necked Cranes.

Zone 2 – Himalayas

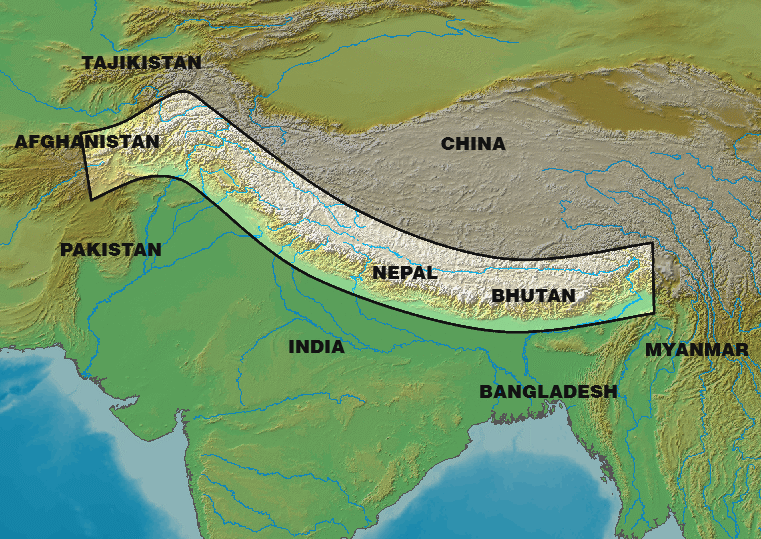
Bio-geographical representation of himalayas.

The Himalayas consist of the youngest and loftiest mountain chains in the world. The 2,400 kilometres (1,500 mi) long Himalayan mountain arc have a unique biodiversity owing to their high altitude, steep gradient and rich temperate flora; biogeographically, they form part of the Palearctic realm. The Himalayas have three biogeographical provinces – Northwest Himalayas, West Himalayas, Central Himalayas and East Himalayas, which together constitute about 6.4% of the country's area.

Tropical rainforests predominate in the Eastern Himalayas while dense subtropical and alpine forests are typical in the Central and Western Himalayas. Oak, chestnut, conifer, ash, pine, and deodar are abundant in Himalayas. Important animals living in the Himalayan ranges include wild sheep, mountain goats, ibex, musk deer and serow. Red panda, black bear, dholes, wolves, martens, weasels, leopard and snow leopard are also found here. However carnivores are scarce and often locally threatened.

Zone 3 – The Indian Desert

This region consists of two biogeographical provinces. The larger is the Thar or Great Indian Desert, adjoining Pakistan and which comprises Rajasthan and parts of Punjab and Haryana. The Indian part of the Thar desert occupies 170,000 km^{2} (66,000 sq mi). The climate is characterised by very hot and dry summer and cold winter. Rainfall is less than 70 cm. The plants are mostly xerophytic. Babul, Kikar, and wild date palm grow in areas of moderate rainfall. The Indian Bustard, a highly endangered bird is found here. Camels, gazelles, foxes, spiny-tailed lizards and snakes are found in hot and arid parts of the desert.

The Rann of Kutch, which lies in Gujarat, is the second biogeographical province. The Rann is a large area of salt marsh that spans the border between Pakistan and India. The larger part is located mostly in Gujarat (primarily the Kutch district). It is divided into the Great Rann and Little Rann, each with distinct characteristics and fauna. The Rann of Kutch is the only large flooded grasslands zone in the Indo-Malayan region. The area has desert on one side and the sea on the other enables various ecosystems, including mangroves and desert vegetation. Its grassland and deserts are home to forms of wildlife that have adapted to its often harsh conditions. These include endemic and endangered animal and plant species, such as the Indian wild ass. The Rann is home to many resident and migratory bird populations including the greater flamingo, lesser flamingo, lesser florican and the houbara bustard. The Little Rann is home to the world's largest population of Indian wild ass. Other mammals found in the Rann include the Indian wolf, desert fox, chinkara, nilgai, blackbuck and others.

Zone 4 - Semi-Arid Areas

Adjoining the desert are the semi-arid areas, a transitional zone between the desert and the denser forests of the Western Ghats. The natural vegetation is thorn forest. This region is characterised by discontinuous vegetation cover with open areas of bare soil and soil-water deficit throughout the year.

Thorny shrubs, grasses and some bamboos are present in some regions. A few species of xerophytic herbs and some ephemeral herbs are found in this semi-arid tract. Jackals, leopards, snakes, fox, buffaloes are found in this region, as well as birds such as Great Indian Bustard, Asian Houbara, Cream-coloured Courser, White-eared Bulbul, Spotted Sandgrouse, Pin-tailed Sandgrouse (or White-bellied Sandgrouse), Black-bellied Sandgrouse, Sykes's Nightjar, Greater Hoopoe-Lark, Black-crowned Sparrow-Lark, Desert Lark (Bar-tailed Finch-Lark), Rufous-tailed Scrub-Robin, Isabelline Wheatear, Asian Desert Warbler are found here.

Zone 5 - Western Ghats

The mountains along the west coast of peninsular India are the Western Ghats, which constitute one of the unique biological regions of the world. The Western Ghats extend from the southern tip of the peninsula (8°N) northwards about 1600 km to the mouth of the river Tapi (21°N).

The mountains rise to average altitudes between 900 and 1500 m above sea level, intercepting monsoon winds from the southwest and creating a rain shadow in the region to their East.

The varied climate and diverse topography create a wide array of habitats that support unique sets of plant and animal species. Apart from biological diversity, the region boasts of high levels of cultural diversity, as many indigenous people inhabit its forests.

The Western Ghats are amongst the 25 biodiversity hot-spots recognized globally. These hills are known for their high levels of endemism expressed at both higher and lower taxonomic levels. Most of the Western Ghat endemic plants are associated with evergreen forests.

The region also shares several plant species with Sri Lanka. The higher altitude forests were, if at all, sparsely populated with tribal people. Rice cultivation in the fertile valley proceeded gardens of early commercial crops like areca nut and pepper. The original vegetation of the ill-drained valley bottoms with sluggish streams in elevations below 100m would be often a special formation, the Myristica swamp.

Expansion of traditional agriculture and the spread of particularly rubber, tea, coffee and forest tree plantations would have wiped out large pockets of primary forests in valleys. The Western Ghats are well known for harboring 14 endemic species of caecilians (i.e., legless amphibians) out of 15 recorded from the region so far.

Zone 6 - Deccan Plateau

Beyond the Ghats is Deccan Plateau, a semi-arid region lying in the rain shadow of the Western ghats . This is the largest unit of the Peninsular Plateau of India. The highlands of the plateau are covered with different types of forests, which provide a large variety of forest products. The Deccan plateau includes the region lying south of the Satpura range.it extends up to the southern tip of peninsular India. Anai mudi is the highest peak of this region. The Deccan plateau is surrounded by the western and the eastern ghats. These ghats meet each other at the Nilgiri hills. The western ghats includes the Sahyadri, Nilgiris, Anamalai, and cardamom hills.many rivers such as Mahanadi, Godavari, krishna, and kaveri originates from western ghats and flow toward the east. The eastern ghats are broken into small hill ranges by river coming from the western ghats. Most of these rivers empty into the Bay of Bengal. The Godavari is the longest river in the Deccan plateau. The Narmada and the Tapi flow westwards and fall into the Arabian sea.

Zone 7 - Gangetic Plain

In the North is the Gangetic plain extending up to the Himalayan foothills. This is the largest unit of the Great Plain of India. Ganga is the main river after whose name this plain is named. The aggradational Great Plains cover about 72.4mha area with the Ganga and the Brahmaputra forming the main drainage axes in the major portion.

The thickness in the alluvial sediments varies considerably with its maximum in the Ganga plains. The physiogeographic scenery varies greatly from arid and semi-arid landscapes of the Rajasthan Plains to the humid and per-humid landscapes of the Delta and Assam valley in the east.

Topographic uniformity, except in the arid Western Rajasthan is a common feature throughout these plains. The plain supports some of the highest population densities depending upon purely agro-based economy in some of these areas. The trees belonging to these forests are teak, sal, shisham, mahua, khair etc.

Zone 8 - North-East India

North-east India is one of the poorest regions in the country. It has several species of orchids, bamboos, ferns and other plants. Here the wild relatives of cultivated plants such as banana, mango, citrus and pepper can be grown.

Zone 9 - Islands

The two groups of islands, i.e., the Arabian Sea islands and Bay Islands differ significantly in origin and physical characteristics. The Arabian Sea Islands (Laccadive, Minicoy, etc.) are the foundered remnants of the old land mass and subsequent coral formations. On the other hand, the Bay Islands lay only about 220 km.

Away from the nearest point on the main land mass and extend about 590 km. With a maximum width of 58 km the island forests of Lakshadweep in the Arabian Sea have some of the best-preserved evergreen forests of India. Some of the islands are fringed with coral reefs. Many of them are covered with thick forests and some are highly dissected.

Zone 10 - Coasts

India has a coastline extending over 7,516. 4 km. The Indian coasts vary in their characteristics and structures. The west coast is narrow except around the Gulf of Cambay and the Gulf of Kutch. In the extreme south, however, it is somewhat wider along the south Sahyadri.

The backwaters are the characteristic features of this coast. The east coast plains, in contrast are broader due to depositional activities of the east-flowing rivers owing to the change in their base levels.

Extensive deltas of the, Godavari, Krishna and Kaveri are the characteristic features of this coast. Mangrove vegetation is characteristic of estuarine tracts along the coast for instance, at Ratnagiri in Maharashtra.

Larger parts of the coastal plains are covered by fertile soils on which different crops are grown. Rice is the main crop of these areas. Coconut trees grow all along the coast.

Coconut and rubber are the main vegetation of coastal area. The main states of coastal areas are- Gujarat, Maharashtra, Goa, Karnataka, Kerala, west Bengal, Odisha, Andhra Pradesh, Tamil Nadu and Puducherry.

== Biodiversity hotspots ==
Biodiversity hotspots of India—Eastern Himalayas: 32; Indo-Burma: 19; Western Ghats and Sri Lanka: 21; and Sundaland (which includes Nicobar Islands): 16.

India also figures prominently in the list of the biodiversity hotspots of the world. A "biodiversity hotspot" is a biogeographical region with significant levels of biodiversity that is threatened by human habitation. This concept was developed by the British environmental expert Norman Myers in 1998 and subsequent years, and finalised in a paper published in Nature in 2000. A total of 25 hotspots were identified at first in which are found as many as 44% of all species of vascular plants and 35% of all species in four vertebrate in just 1.4% of the land surface of the Earth. An additional 10 hotspots were added subsequently. The concept of biodiversity hotspots designates those areas most important from the point of view of biodiversity, and is of special importance to endemic species. The designated 35 hotspots harbour over 50% of the world's endemic plant species and 42% of all endemic terrestrial vertebrate species, yet they constitute only 2.3% of the Earth's land surface. Biodiversity hotspots are even more crucial for conservation as each hotspot faces substantial and numerous threats; each hotspot is estimated to have already lost at least 70% of its original natural vegetation.

India is home to four biodiversity hotspots—Andaman & Nicobar Islands, Eastern Himalaya, Indo-Burma region, and the Western Ghats.

Andaman & Nicobar Islands

The Andaman islands (as part of serial 19 Indo-Burma) and Nicobar Islands (as part of serial 16 Sundaland).

Eastern Himalaya

Serial 32 in the list. The Eastern Himalayas was originally part of the Indo-Burma Biodiversity Hotspot. In 2004, a hotspot reappraisal classified the region as part of two hotspots: Indo-Burma and the newly distinguished Himalaya. The Eastern Himalaya includes Bhutan, southern, central and eastern Nepal, and northeastern India, and comprises 11 Key Biodiversity Areas (occupying 750,000 hectares). The region includes the lowland regions as well as montane regions and spans two realms —the Palearctic and the Indomalayan. The region has extremely rich plat and faunal communities as well as a number of iconic endangered species. A number of key protected areas are located in this biodiversity hotspot.

Indo-Burma region

Serial 19 in the list.

Western Ghats

Serial 21 in the list. This region centres upon the Western Ghats range of mountains that runs along the west coast, which accounts for less than 6% of the national land area, but contains a rich endemic assemblage of plants, reptiles and amphibians, that comprises more than 30% of all bird, fish, herpetofauna, mammal, and plant species found in the country, including endangered iconic species such as the Asian elephant (Elephas maximus) and tiger (Panthera tigris), besides others.
