= Eastern Himalayan subalpine conifer forests =

Ecoregion in Asia

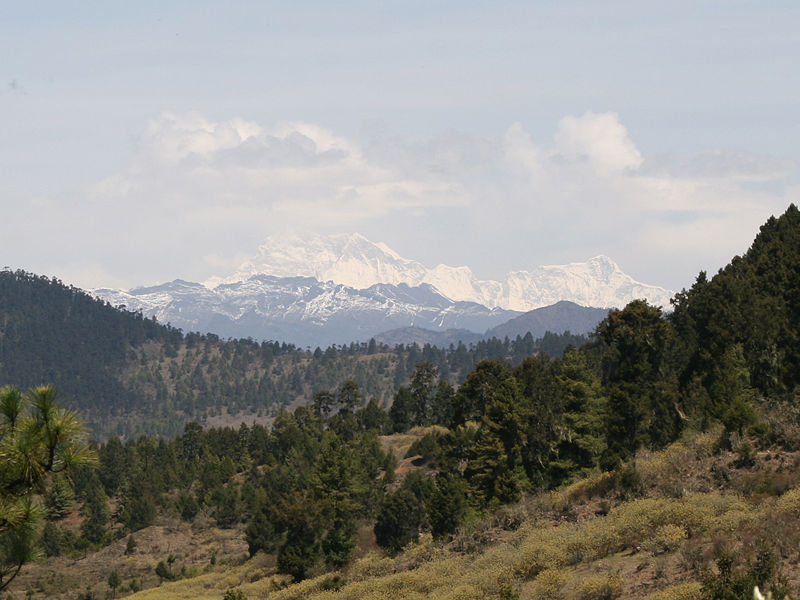
- Gangkhar Puensum from Ura La, Bhutan

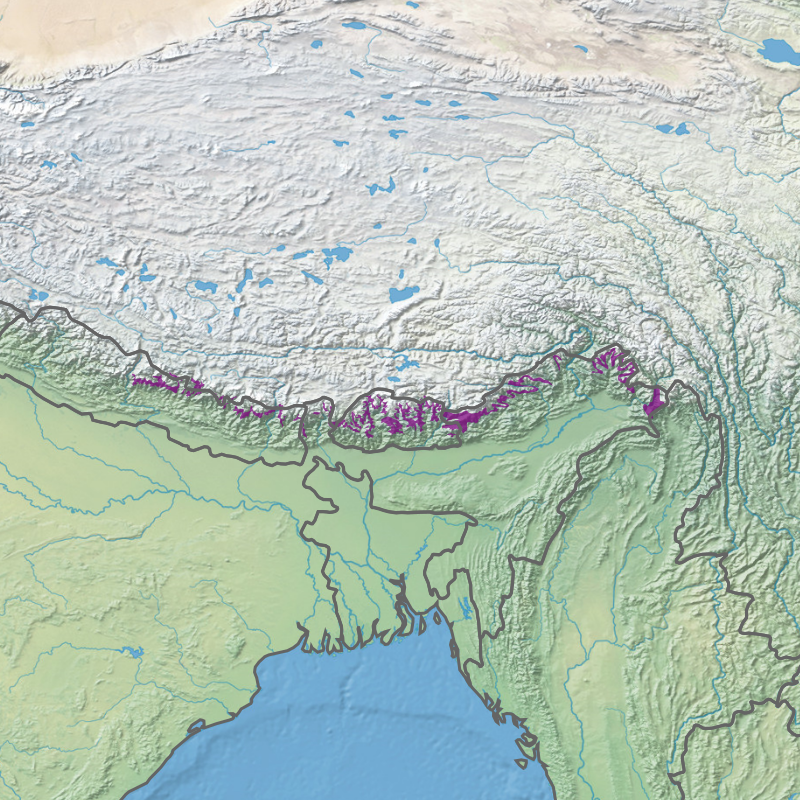
- Ecoregion territory (in purple)

Ecology
- Realm: Indomalayan
- Biome: Temperate coniferous forests
- Borders: Northeastern Himalayan subalpine conifer forests; Eastern Himalayan alpine shrub and meadows; Eastern Himalayan broadleaf forests; Himalayan subtropical pine forests
- Bird species: 202
- Mammal species: 130

Geography
- Area: 27,500 km^{2} (10,600 sq mi)
- Countries: List: Bhutan; India; Nepal; Myanmar; China

Conservation
- Conservation status: Vulnerable
- Habitat loss: 28.324%
- Protected: 34.69%

The Eastern Himalayan subalpine conifer forests is a temperate coniferous forests ecoregion which is found in the middle and upper elevations of the eastern Middle Himalayas, in western Nepal, Bhutan, northern Indian states including Arunachal Pradesh and Sikkim and adjacent Myanmar and China.

== Setting ==
The ecoregion forms a belt of coniferous forest covering 27,500 square kilometres (10,600 sq mi) from 3,000 to 4,000 metres (9,800 to 13,100 ft) elevation extending from the Gandaki River in Nepal east through Bhutan and into Arunachal Pradesh and Tibet. It is part of a transition zone from the Indomalayan realm in the south, to the Palearctic realm in the north, and is the last habitat below the treeline of the Himalayas. The Himalayas are lined with belts of habitat from the grassy foothills to the high peaks and are home to a number of birds and animals that migrate seasonally through these zones, including these conifer forests, each of which provides crucial habitat at different times of the year. Furthermore the streams and rivers of the steep mountainsides will flood if not held in place by woodland.

The Eastern Himalayas are watered by the Bay of Bengal monsoon so are wetter than in the west and have a higher treeline (4,500m compared to 3,000m in the western Himalayas).

== Flora ==
These forests are typically found on steep, rocky, north-facing slopes. The most common trees are Abies spectabilis, Larix griffithii, Juniperus recurva, Juniperus indica, Betula utilis, Acer spp., and Sorbus spp. The understory features a rich community of colourful rhododendrons, including Rhododendron hodgsonii, Rhododendron barbatum, Rhododendron campylocarpum, Rhododendron campanulatum, Rhododendron fulgens, and Rhododendron thomsonii. Other shrubs include Viburnum grandiflorum and Lonicera angustifolia.

Tsuga dumosa occurs in wetter areas and lower elevations. Pinus wallichiana occurs in drier areas around Tibet. It is particularly common in the Khumbu region. Taxus baccata is important but uncommon.

Juniper woodlands grow in flat, inner river valleys, mixed with various species of Salix and Prunus. Those in the Tsarijathang Valley in Bhutan's Jigme Dorji National Park are an important summer habitat for takin (Budorcas taxicolor).

== Fauna ==
This ecoregion is home to some eighty-nine species of mammals originally from both Indomalayan and Palearctic realms, including civets, martens, Himalayan tahr and muntjac. The white-bellied musk deer, hunted for its musk-glands, and the endangered red panda are important inhabitants for whom the conifer forests are typical habitat with the red panda living between 3,000m and 4,000m where there is an undercover of bamboo beneath the fir trees. Other endangered species found here are the takin, Himalayan serow (Capricornis thar), and particolored flying squirrel (Hylopetes alboniger) while Mandelli's mouse-eared bat, the Asiatic wild dog, the Asiatic black bear and the Himalayan tahr are considered vulnerable. There are two near-endemic squirrels, Hodgson's giant flying squirrel (Petaurista magnificus) and the Bhutan giant flying squirrel (Petaurista nobilis) along with a pure endemic rodent, the Himalayan field mouse (Apodemus gurkha).

About 200 species of birds have been recorded in this ecoregion of which six are endemic; chestnut-breasted partridge (Arborophila mandellii), hoary-throated barwing (Actinodura nipalensis), brown-throated fulvetta (Alcippe ludlowi), Nepal cupwing (Pnoepyga immaculata), buff-throated partridge (Tetraophasis szechenyii), and Lord Derby's parakeet (Psittacula derbiana). The last two are limited to an area of conifer forest in Arunachal Pradesh. Threatened or endangered birds of the ecoregion include Tibetan eared pheasant (Crossoptilon harmani) and Sclater's monal (Lophophorus sclateri). A number of other birds are sensitive to habitat change and therefore potentially vulnerable, including the blood pheasant (Ithaginis cruentus), Blyth's tragopan (Tragopan blythii), satyr tragopan (Tragopan satyra), Ward's trogon (Harpactes wardi) and chestnut-breasted partridge. Indeed this ecoregion forms part of two BirdLife International Endemic Bird Areas because of the number of birds for which the conifers are important for breeding.

== Threats and conservation ==
The human population of these heights is very low and most of the natural conifer forest remains with a considerable portion in protected areas. Damage is caused as trees are cut to provide firewood for local inhabitants and for trekking parties or to clear land for grazing.

34.69% of the ecoregion is in protected areas. Large protected areas that contain areas of conifer forest include Annapurna Conservation Area, Langtang and Makalu Barun National Parks in Nepal, Khangchendzonga, Namdapha and Singalila National Parks in India, and Sakteng Wildlife Sanctuary, Jigme Singye Wangchuck, and Jigme Dorji National Parks in Bhutan.

== See also ==
- List of ecoregions in India
