= Western Himalayan alpine shrub and meadows =

Ecoregion in Asia

- Western Himalayan alpine shrub and meadows in Valley of Flowers National Park in Uttarakhand, India

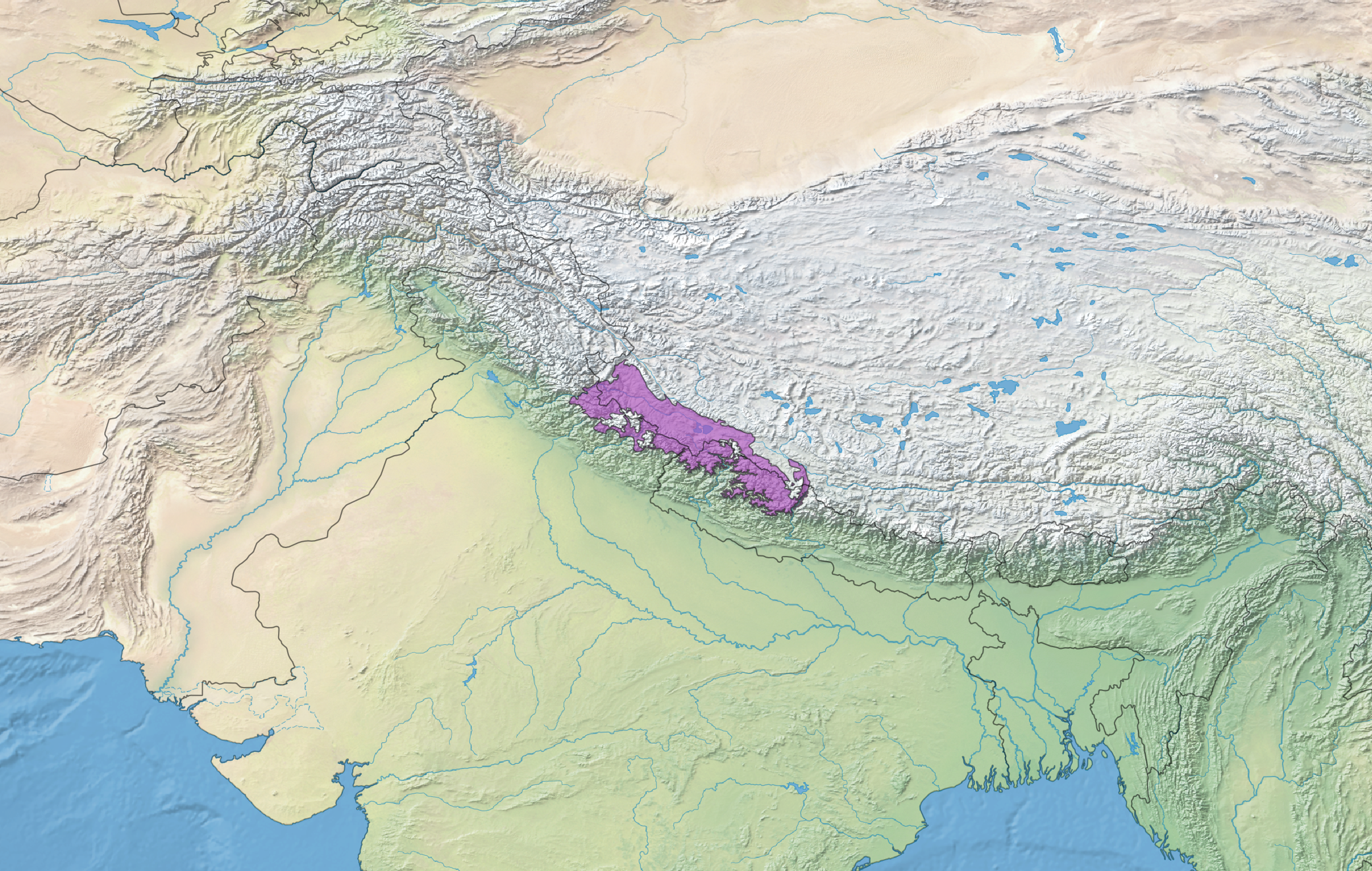
- Map of Western Himalayan alpine shrub and meadows (purple)

Ecology
- Realm: Palearctic
- Biome: Montane grasslands and shrublands
- Borders: List: Northwestern Himalayan alpine shrub and meadows; Karakoram-West Tibetan Plateau alpine steppe; Central Tibetan Plateau alpine steppe; Yarlung Tsangpo arid steppe; Eastern Himalayan alpine shrub and meadows; Western Himalayan subalpine conifer forests; Western Himalayan broadleaf forests
- Bird species: 389
- Mammal species: 61

Geography
- Area: 70,200 km^{2} (27,100 sq mi)
- Countries: China; India; Nepal

Conservation
- Habitat loss: 17.291%
- Protected: 19.18%

The Western Himalayan alpine shrub and meadows is a montane grasslands and shrublands ecoregion of Nepal, India, and Tibet, which lies between the tree line and snow line in the western portion of the Himalaya Range.

== Setting ==
The Western Himalayan alpine shrub and meadows covers an area of 70,200 square kilometres (27,100 sq mi), extending from the Kali Gandaki Gorge in central Nepal westwards across Uttarakhand and eastern Himachal Pradesh states of India to the gorge of the Sutlej River, and into southwestern Tibet. The alpine shrub and meadows lie between approximately 3,000 and 5,000 metres (9,800 and 16,400 ft) elevation.

The Eastern Himalayan alpine shrub and meadows lie east of the Kali Gandaki gorge, while the Northwestern Himalayan alpine shrub and meadows lies west of the Sutlej. Below 3,000 metres (9,800 ft) lie the Western Himalayan subalpine conifer forests. Permanent ice and snow lies above 5,000 metres (16,000 ft). To the north, the Western Himalayan alpine shrub and meadows transition to the drier Central Tibetan Plateau alpine steppe of central Tibet. The Karakoram-West Tibetan Plateau alpine steppe lies to the southwest.

== Flora ==
Alpine shrublands, dominated by the rhododendron species Rhododendron campanulatum and R. barbatum, predominate at lower elevations close to the treeline. The shrubs form a krummholz or stunted forest of low, dense, twisted woody plants.

Above the shrublands are alpine meadows, known as bugyals or bughiyals, which support a variety of herbaceous plants, including species of Anaphalis, Cyananthus, Jurinea, Morina, Potentilla, Gentiana, Delphinium, Meconopsis, Pedicularis, Anemone, Aster, Polygonum, Primula, and Saussurea. In the spring and summer, the alpine meadows are covered with brightly colored flowers.

On the upper slopes, low plants of genera Saxifraga, Allium, Corydalis, Eriophyton, Stellaria, Soroseris, and Cremanthodium grow among the boulders and scree.

An alpine steppe of Caragana pygma, C. gerardiana, Lonicera spinosa, Juniperus squamata, Juniperus indica, Ephedra gerardiana, Hippophae tibetana, Myricaria rosea, Lonicera spinulosa, and Berberis can be found in drier parts of the ecoregion.

== Fauna ==
Large mammals include the snow leopard (Uncia uncia), bharal or Himalayan blue sheep (Pseudois nayaur), Himalayan tahr (Hemitragus jemlahicus), Himalayan musk deer (Moschus chrysogaster), and mainland serow (Capricornis sumatraensis). Smaller mammals include weasels and pikas.

Native birds of the alpine shrubland or krummholz zone include the blood pheasant (Ithaginis cruentus), satyr tragopan (Tragopan satyra), Himalayan monal (Lophophorus impejanus), and hill partridge (Arborophila torqueola).

== Conservation ==
Several protected areas lie within or partly within the ecoregion, including:

- Royal Dhorpatan Hunting Reserve (Nepal)
- Govind Pashu Vihar Wildlife Sanctuary (Uttarakhand, India)
- Lippa Asrang Wildlife Sanctuary (Himachal Pradesh, India)
- Sangla Wildlife Sanctuary (Raksham Chitkul) (Himachal Pradesh, India)
- Gangotri National Park (Uttarakhand, India)
- Kedarnath Wild Life Sanctuary (Uttarakhand, India)
- Valley of Flowers National Park (Uttarakhand, India)
- Nanda Devi National Park (Uttarakhand, India)
- Shey-Phoksundo National Park (Nepal)
- Annapurna Conservation Area (Nepal)

== See also ==
- List of ecoregions in India
