= List of ecoregions in India =

Ecoregions of the world, spanning all land area (terrestrial) of the planet, were first defined and mapped in 2001 and subsequently revised in 2017. Later, freshwater ecoregions and marine ecoregions of the world were identified. Within India, there are 46 terrestrial ecoregions, 14 freshwater ecoregions, and 6 marine ecoregions.

== Terrestrial ecoregions ==
The terrestrial ecoregions of the world include 45 ecoregions that fall entirely or partly within the boundaries of India. These ecoregions fall within two biogeographic realms: Indomalayan and Palearctic. They also fall under ten biomes: Deserts and Xeric Shrublands, Flooded Grasslands and Savannas, Mangroves, Montane Grasslands and Shrublands, Temperate Broadleaf and Mixed Forests, Temperate Coniferous Forests, Tropical and Subtropical Coniferous Forests, Tropical and Subtropical Dry Broadleaf Forests, Tropical and Subtropical Grasslands, Savannas and Shrublands, and Tropical and Subtropical Moist Broadleaf Forests. The ecoregion Rock and Ice is not included under any specific biome or biogeographic realm.

| Picture | Ecoregion | State or union territories | Biome | Realm |
|---|---|---|---|---|
| Neil Island | Andaman Islands rain forests | Andaman and Nicobar Islands | Tropical and subtropical moist broadleaf forests | Indomalayan |
| Indian elephants in Kaziranga National Park | Brahmaputra Valley semi-evergreen forests | Arunachal Pradesh | Tropical and subtropical moist broadleaf forests | Indomalayan |
| | Brahmaputra Valley semi-evergreen forests | Assam | Tropical and subtropical moist broadleaf forests | Indomalayan |
| | Brahmaputra Valley semi-evergreen forests | Meghalaya | Tropical and subtropical moist broadleaf forests | Indomalayan |
| | Brahmaputra Valley semi-evergreen forests | Nagaland | Tropical and subtropical moist broadleaf forests | Indomalayan |
| | Central Tibetan Plateau alpine steppe | Jammu and Kashmir | Montane grasslands and shrublands | Palearctic |
| Kambalakonda Wildlife Sanctuary | East Deccan moist deciduous forests | Andhra Pradesh | Tropical and subtropical moist broadleaf forests | Indomalayan |
| | East Deccan moist deciduous forests | Chhattisgarh | Tropical and subtropical moist broadleaf forests | Indomalayan |
| | East Deccan moist deciduous forests | Jharkhand | Tropical and subtropical moist broadleaf forests | Indomalayan |
| | East Deccan moist deciduous forests | Madhya Pradesh | Tropical and subtropical moist broadleaf forests | Indomalayan |
| | East Deccan moist deciduous forests | Maharashtra | Tropical and subtropical moist broadleaf forests | Indomalayan |
| | East Deccan moist deciduous forests | Odisha | Tropical and subtropical moist broadleaf forests | Indomalayan |
| | East Deccan moist deciduous forests | Telangana | Tropical and subtropical moist broadleaf forests | Indomalayan |
| | East Deccan moist deciduous forests | West Bengal | Tropical and subtropical moist broadleaf forests | Indomalayan |
| Valmiki National Park | Himalayan subtropical broadleaf forests | Bihar | Tropical and subtropical moist broadleaf forests | Indomalayan |
| | Himalayan subtropical broadleaf forests | Sikkim | Tropical and subtropical moist broadleaf forests | Indomalayan |
| | Himalayan subtropical broadleaf forests | Uttar Pradesh | Tropical and subtropical moist broadleaf forests | Indomalayan |
| | Himalayan subtropical broadleaf forests | Uttarakhand | Tropical and subtropical moist broadleaf forests | Indomalayan |
| | Himalayan subtropical broadleaf forests | West Bengal | Tropical and subtropical moist broadleaf forests | Indomalayan |
| Kaimur Wildlife Sanctuary | Lower Gangetic Plains moist deciduous forests | Assam | Tropical and subtropical moist broadleaf forests | Indomalayan |
| | Lower Gangetic Plains moist deciduous forests | Bihar | Tropical and subtropical moist broadleaf forests | Indomalayan |
| | Lower Gangetic Plains moist deciduous forests | Jharkhand | Tropical and subtropical moist broadleaf forests | Indomalayan |
| | Lower Gangetic Plains moist deciduous forests | Madhya Pradesh | Tropical and subtropical moist broadleaf forests | Indomalayan |
| | Lower Gangetic Plains moist deciduous forests | Odisha | Tropical and subtropical moist broadleaf forests | Indomalayan |
| | Lower Gangetic Plains moist deciduous forests | Tripura | Tropical and subtropical moist broadleaf forests | Indomalayan |
| | Lower Gangetic Plains moist deciduous forests | Uttar Pradesh | Tropical and subtropical moist broadleaf forests | Indomalayan |
| | Lower Gangetic Plains moist deciduous forests | West Bengal | Tropical and subtropical moist broadleaf forests | Indomalayan |
| Sanjay Gandhi National Park | Malabar Coast moist forests | Goa | Tropical and subtropical moist broadleaf forests | Indomalayan |
| | Malabar Coast moist forests | Karnataka | Tropical and subtropical moist broadleaf forests | Indomalayan |
| | Malabar Coast moist forests | Kerala | Tropical and subtropical moist broadleaf forests | Indomalayan |
| | Malabar Coast moist forests | Maharashtra | Tropical and subtropical moist broadleaf forests | Indomalayan |
| | Malabar Coast moist forests | Tamil Nadu | Tropical and subtropical moist broadleaf forests | Indomalayan |
| Lakshadweep | Maldives–Lakshadweep–Chagos Archipelago tropical moist forests | Lakshadweep | Tropical and subtropical moist broadleaf forests | Indomalayan |
| Khrangsuri waterfall | Meghalaya subtropical forests | Assam | Tropical and subtropical moist broadleaf forests | Indomalayan |
| | Meghalaya subtropical forests | Meghalaya | Tropical and subtropical moist broadleaf forests | Indomalayan |
| | Meghalaya subtropical forests | Tripura | Tropical and subtropical moist broadleaf forests | Indomalayan |
| | Meghalaya subtropical forests | Nagaland | Tropical and subtropical moist broadleaf forests | Indomalayan |
| Hlimen Damveng, Mizoram | Mizoram–Manipur–Kachin rain forests | Assam | Tropical and subtropical moist broadleaf forests | Indomalayan |
| | Mizoram–Manipur–Kachin rain forests | Manipur | Tropical and subtropical moist broadleaf forests | Indomalayan |
| | Mizoram–Manipur–Kachin rain forests | Mizoram | Tropical and subtropical moist broadleaf forests | Indomalayan |
| | Mizoram–Manipur–Kachin rain forests | Nagaland | Tropical and subtropical moist broadleaf forests | Indomalayan |
| | Mizoram–Manipur–Kachin rain forests | Tripura | Tropical and subtropical moist broadleaf forests | Indomalayan |
| View of Nicobar Islands | Nicobar Islands rain forests | Andaman and Nicobar Islands | Tropical and subtropical moist broadleaf forests | Indomalayan |
| Kali Tiger Reserve | North Western Ghats moist deciduous forests | Dadra and Nagar Haveli and Daman and Diu | Tropical and subtropical moist broadleaf forests | Indomalayan |
| | North Western Ghats moist deciduous forests | Goa | Tropical and subtropical moist broadleaf forests | Indomalayan |
| | North Western Ghats moist deciduous forests | Gujarat | Tropical and subtropical moist broadleaf forests | Indomalayan |
| | North Western Ghats moist deciduous forests | Karnataka | Tropical and subtropical moist broadleaf forests | Indomalayan |
| | North Western Ghats moist deciduous forests | Maharashtra | Tropical and subtropical moist broadleaf forests | Indomalayan |
| Kudremukh National Park | North Western Ghats montane rain forests | Goa | Tropical and subtropical moist broadleaf forests | Indomalayan |
| | North Western Ghats montane rain forests | Gujarat | Tropical and subtropical moist broadleaf forests | Indomalayan |
| | North Western Ghats montane rain forests | Karnataka | Tropical and subtropical moist broadleaf forests | Indomalayan |
| | North Western Ghats montane rain forests | Maharashtra | Tropical and subtropical moist broadleaf forests | Indomalayan |
| Chandaka Elephant Sanctuary | Odisha semi-evergreen forests | Andhra Pradesh | Tropical and subtropical moist broadleaf forests | Indomalayan |
| | Odisha semi-evergreen forests | Odisha | Tropical and subtropical moist broadleaf forests | Indomalayan |
| Bandipur National Park | South Western Ghats moist deciduous forests | Karnataka | Tropical and subtropical moist broadleaf forests | Indomalayan |
| | South Western Ghats moist deciduous forests | Kerala | Tropical and subtropical moist broadleaf forests | Indomalayan |
| | South Western Ghats moist deciduous forests | Tamil Nadu | Tropical and subtropical moist broadleaf forests | Indomalayan |
| | South Western Ghats montane rain forests | Karnataka | Tropical and subtropical moist broadleaf forests | Indomalayan |
| | South Western Ghats montane rain forests | Kerala | Tropical and subtropical moist broadleaf forests | Indomalayan |
| | South Western Ghats montane rain forests | Tamil Nadu | Tropical and subtropical moist broadleaf forests | Indomalayan |
| | Sundarbans freshwater swamp forests | West Bengal | Tropical and subtropical moist broadleaf forests | Indomalayan |
| malcha forest near New Delhi | Upper Gangetic Plains moist deciduous forests | Bihar | Tropical and subtropical moist broadleaf forests | Indomalayan |
| | Upper Gangetic Plains moist deciduous forests | Delhi | Tropical and subtropical moist broadleaf forests | Indomalayan |
| | Upper Gangetic Plains moist deciduous forests | Haryana | Tropical and subtropical moist broadleaf forests | Indomalayan |
| | Upper Gangetic Plains moist deciduous forests | Himachal Pradesh | Tropical and subtropical moist broadleaf forests | Indomalayan |
| | Upper Gangetic Plains moist deciduous forests | Madhya Pradesh | Tropical and subtropical moist broadleaf forests | Indomalayan |
| | Upper Gangetic Plains moist deciduous forests | Rajasthan | Tropical and subtropical moist broadleaf forests | Indomalayan |
| | Upper Gangetic Plains moist deciduous forests | Uttar Pradesh | Tropical and subtropical moist broadleaf forests | Indomalayan |
| | Upper Gangetic Plains moist deciduous forests | Uttarakhand | Tropical and subtropical moist broadleaf forests | Indomalayan |
| | Central Deccan Plateau dry deciduous forests | Andhra Pradesh | Tropical and subtropical dry broadleaf forests | Indomalayan |
| | Central Deccan Plateau dry deciduous forests | Chhattisgarh | Tropical and subtropical dry broadleaf forests | Indomalayan |
| | Central Deccan Plateau dry deciduous forests | Karnataka | Tropical and subtropical dry broadleaf forests | Indomalayan |
| | Central Deccan Plateau dry deciduous forests | Madhya Pradesh | Tropical and subtropical dry broadleaf forests | Indomalayan |
| | Central Deccan Plateau dry deciduous forests | Maharashtra | Tropical and subtropical dry broadleaf forests | Indomalayan |
| | Central Deccan Plateau dry deciduous forests | Telangana | Tropical and subtropical dry broadleaf forests | Indomalayan |
| | Chota Nagpur dry deciduous forests | Bihar | Tropical and subtropical dry broadleaf forests | Indomalayan |
| | Chota Nagpur dry deciduous forests | Chhattisgarh | Tropical and subtropical dry broadleaf forests | Indomalayan |
| | Chota Nagpur dry deciduous forests | Jharkhand | Tropical and subtropical dry broadleaf forests | Indomalayan |
| | Chota Nagpur dry deciduous forests | Madhya Pradesh | Tropical and subtropical dry broadleaf forests | Indomalayan |
| | Chota Nagpur dry deciduous forests | Odisha | Tropical and subtropical dry broadleaf forests | Indomalayan |
| | Chota Nagpur dry deciduous forests | Uttar Pradesh | Tropical and subtropical dry broadleaf forests | Indomalayan |
| | Chota Nagpur dry deciduous forests | West Bengal | Tropical and subtropical dry broadleaf forests | Indomalayan |
| | East Deccan dry evergreen forests | Andhra Pradesh | Tropical and subtropical dry broadleaf forests | Indomalayan |
| | East Deccan dry evergreen forests | Puducherry | Tropical and subtropical dry broadleaf forests | Indomalayan |
| | East Deccan dry evergreen forests | Tamil Nadu | Tropical and subtropical dry broadleaf forests | Indomalayan |
| | Khathiar–Gir dry deciduous forests | Dadra and Nagar Haveli and Daman and Diu | Tropical and subtropical dry broadleaf forests | Indomalayan |
| | Khathiar–Gir dry deciduous forests | Gujarat | Tropical and subtropical dry broadleaf forests | Indomalayan |
| | Khathiar–Gir dry deciduous forests | Haryana | Tropical and subtropical dry broadleaf forests | Indomalayan |
| | Khathiar–Gir dry deciduous forests | Madhya Pradesh | Tropical and subtropical dry broadleaf forests | Indomalayan |
| | Khathiar–Gir dry deciduous forests | Maharashtra | Tropical and subtropical dry broadleaf forests | Indomalayan |
| | Khathiar–Gir dry deciduous forests | Rajasthan | Tropical and subtropical dry broadleaf forests | Indomalayan |
| | Khathiar–Gir dry deciduous forests | Uttar Pradesh | Tropical and subtropical dry broadleaf forests | Indomalayan |
| | Narmada Valley dry deciduous forests | Chhattisgarh | Tropical and subtropical dry broadleaf forests | Indomalayan |
| | Narmada Valley dry deciduous forests | Gujarat | Tropical and subtropical dry broadleaf forests | Indomalayan |
| | Narmada Valley dry deciduous forests | Karnataka | Tropical and subtropical dry broadleaf forests | Indomalayan |
| | Narmada Valley dry deciduous forests | Madhya Pradesh | Tropical and subtropical dry broadleaf forests | Indomalayan |
| | Narmada Valley dry deciduous forests | Maharashtra | Tropical and subtropical dry broadleaf forests | Indomalayan |
| | Narmada Valley dry deciduous forests | Uttar Pradesh | Tropical and subtropical dry broadleaf forests | Indomalayan |
| | North Tibetan Plateau-Kunlun Mountains alpine desert | Jammu and Kashmir | Montane grasslands and shrublands | Palearctic |
| | North Deccan dry deciduous forests | Chhattisgarh | Tropical and subtropical dry broadleaf forests | Indomalayan |
| | North Deccan dry deciduous forests | Odisha | Tropical and subtropical dry broadleaf forests | Indomalayan |
| | South Deccan Plateau dry deciduous forests | Karnataka | Tropical and subtropical dry broadleaf forests | Indomalayan |
| | South Deccan Plateau dry deciduous forests | Tamil Nadu | Tropical and subtropical dry broadleaf forests | Indomalayan |
| Jim Corbett National Park | Himalayan subtropical pine forests | Himachal Pradesh | Tropical and subtropical coniferous forests | Indomalayan |
| | Himalayan subtropical pine forests | Jammu and Kashmir | Tropical and subtropical coniferous forests | Indomalayan |
| | Himalayan subtropical pine forests | Sikkim | Tropical and subtropical coniferous forests | Indomalayan |
| | Himalayan subtropical pine forests | Uttarakhand | Tropical and subtropical coniferous forests | Indomalayan |
| | Himalayan subtropical pine forests | West Bengal | Tropical and subtropical coniferous forests | Indomalayan |
| | Northeast India–Myanmar pine forests | Manipur | Tropical and subtropical coniferous forests | Indomalayan |
| | Northeast India–Myanmar pine forests | Nagaland | Tropical and subtropical coniferous forests | Indomalayan |
| Eaglenest Wildlife Sanctuary | Eastern Himalayan broadleaf forests | Arunachal Pradesh | Temperate broadleaf and mixed forests | Indomalayan |
| | Eastern Himalayan broadleaf forests | Assam | Temperate broadleaf and mixed forests | Indomalayan |
| | Eastern Himalayan broadleaf forests | Nagaland | Temperate broadleaf and mixed forests | Indomalayan |
| | Eastern Himalayan broadleaf forests | Sikkim | Temperate broadleaf and mixed forests | Indomalayan |
| | Eastern Himalayan broadleaf forests | West Bengal | Temperate broadleaf and mixed forests | Indomalayan |
| | Western Himalayan broadleaf forests | Himachal Pradesh | Temperate broadleaf and mixed forests | Indomalayan |
| | Western Himalayan broadleaf forests | Jammu and Kashmir | Temperate broadleaf and mixed forests | Indomalayan |
| | Western Himalayan broadleaf forests | Punjab | Temperate broadleaf and mixed forests | Indomalayan |
| | Western Himalayan broadleaf forests | Uttarakhand | Temperate broadleaf and mixed forests | Indomalayan |
| | Eastern Himalayan subalpine conifer forests | Arunachal Pradesh | Temperate coniferous forests | Indomalayan |
| | Eastern Himalayan subalpine conifer forests | Sikkim | Temperate coniferous forests | Indomalayan |
| | Eastern Himalayan subalpine conifer forests | West Bengal | Temperate coniferous forests | Indomalayan |
| Chail, Himachal Pradesh | Western Himalayan subalpine conifer forests | Himachal Pradesh | Temperate coniferous forests | Indomalayan |
| | Western Himalayan subalpine conifer forests | Jammu and Kashmir | Temperate coniferous forests | Indomalayan |
| | Western Himalayan subalpine conifer forests | Ladakh | Temperate coniferous forests | Indomalayan |
| | Western Himalayan subalpine conifer forests | Uttarakhand | Temperate coniferous forests | Indomalayan |
| Dudhwa National Park | Terai–Duar savanna and grasslands | Assam | Tropical and subtropical grasslands, savannas, and shrublands | Indomalayan |
| | Terai–Duar savanna and grasslands | Bihar | Tropical and subtropical grasslands, savannas, and shrublands | Indomalayan |
| | Terai–Duar savanna and grasslands | Uttar Pradesh | Tropical and subtropical grasslands, savannas, and shrublands | Indomalayan |
| | Terai–Duar savanna and grasslands | Uttarakhand | Tropical and subtropical grasslands, savannas, and shrublands | Indomalayan |
| | Terai–Duar savanna and grasslands | West Bengal | Tropical and subtropical grasslands, savannas, and shrublands | Indomalayan |
| little Rann of Kutch | Rann of Kutch seasonal salt marsh | Gujarat | Flooded grasslands and savannas | Indomalayan |
| Remnants of the Deccan Traps | Deccan thorn scrub forests | Andhra Pradesh | Deserts and xeric shrublands | Indomalayan |
| | Deccan thorn scrub forests | Karnataka | Deserts and xeric shrublands | Indomalayan |
| | Deccan thorn scrub forests | Madhya Pradesh | Deserts and xeric shrublands | Indomalayan |
| | Deccan thorn scrub forests | Maharashtra | Deserts and xeric shrublands | Indomalayan |
| | Deccan thorn scrub forests | Tamil Nadu | Deserts and xeric shrublands | Indomalayan |
| | Deccan thorn scrub forests | Telangana | Deserts and xeric shrublands | Indomalayan |
| Patiala | Aravalli west thorn scrub forests | Chandigarh | Deserts and xeric shrublands | Indomalayan |
| | Aravalli west thorn scrub forests | Delhi | Deserts and xeric shrublands | Indomalayan |
| | Aravalli west thorn scrub forests | Gujarat | Deserts and xeric shrublands | Indomalayan |
| | Aravalli west thorn scrub forests | Haryana | Deserts and xeric shrublands | Indomalayan |
| | Aravalli west thorn scrub forests | Himachal Pradesh | Deserts and xeric shrublands | Indomalayan |
| | Aravalli west thorn scrub forests | Jammu and Kashmir | Deserts and xeric shrublands | Indomalayan |
| | Aravalli west thorn scrub forests | Punjab | Deserts and xeric shrublands | Indomalayan |
| | Aravalli west thorn scrub forests | Rajasthan | Deserts and xeric shrublands | Indomalayan |
| Thar Desert in India | Thar Desert | Gujarat | Deserts and xeric shrublands | Indomalayan |
| | Thar Desert | Haryana | Deserts and xeric shrublands | Indomalayan |
| | Thar Desert | Rajasthan | Deserts and xeric shrublands | Indomalayan |
| Krishna mangroves | Godavari–Krishna mangroves | Andhra Pradesh | Mangrove | Indomalayan |
| | Godavari–Krishna mangroves | Odisha | Mangrove | Indomalayan |
| | Godavari–Krishna mangroves | Tamil Nadu | Mangrove | Indomalayan |
| view of Indus River Delta–Arabian Sea mangroves | Indus River Delta–Arabian Sea mangroves | Dadra and Nagar Haveli and Daman and Diu | Mangrove | Indomalayan |
| | Indus River Delta–Arabian Sea mangroves | Gujarat | Mangrove | Indomalayan |
| | Indus River Delta–Arabian Sea mangroves | Maharashtra | Mangrove | Indomalayan |
| Sundarbans | Sundarbans mangroves | West Bengal | Mangrove | Indomalayan |
| | Northeastern Himalayan subalpine conifer forests | Arunachal Pradesh | Temperate coniferous forests | Palearctic |
| Nanda Devi Hills | Eastern Himalayan alpine shrub and meadows | Arunachal Pradesh | Montane grasslands and shrublands | Palearctic |
| | Eastern Himalayan alpine shrub and meadows | Sikkim | Montane grasslands and shrublands | Palearctic |
| Ladakh | Karakoram–West Tibetan Plateau alpine steppe | Ladakh | Montane grasslands and shrublands | Palearctic |
| Pin Valley National Park | Northwestern Himalayan alpine shrub and meadows | Himachal Pradesh | Montane grasslands and shrublands | Palearctic |
| | Northwestern Himalayan alpine shrub and meadows | Jammu and Kashmir | Montane grasslands and shrublands | Palearctic |
| | Northwestern Himalayan alpine shrub and meadows | Ladakh | Montane grasslands and shrublands | Palearctic |
| Valley of flowers national park | Western Himalayan alpine shrub and meadows | Himachal Pradesh | Montane grasslands and shrublands | Palearctic |
| | Western Himalayan alpine shrub and meadows | Uttarakhand | Montane grasslands and shrublands | Palearctic |
| | Baluchistan xeric woodlands | Punjab | Deserts and xeric shrublands | Palearctic |

== Freshwater ecoregions ==
Freshwater ecoregions of the world have been defined as "a large area encompassing one or more freshwater systems with a distinct assemblage of natural freshwater communities and species. The freshwater species, dynamics, and environmental conditions within a given ecoregion are more similar to each other than to those of surrounding ecoregions, and together form a conservation unit." The following 14 freshwater ecoregions occur within India.

- Upper Indus
- Indus Himalayan Foothills
- Lower and Middle Indus
- Ganges Himalayan Foothills
- Middle Brahmaputra
- Chin Hills–Arakan Coast
- Ganges Delta and Plain
- Narmada–Tapti
- Northern Deccan Plateau
- Southern Deccan Plateau
- Southeastern Ghats
- Western Ghats
- Andaman Islands
- Nicobar Islands

== Marine ecoregions ==
Marine ecoregions of the world have been described across the worlds oceans and seas. India's seas are in the Western Indo-Pacific marine realm. This includes the following four provinces and six marine ecoregions.

- West and South Indian Shelf province
  - Western India
  - South India and Sri Lanka
- Central Indian Ocean Islands province
  - Maldives
- Bay of Bengal province
  - Eastern India
  - Northern Bay of Bengal
- Andaman province
  - Andaman and Nicobar Islands

== Global 200 ecoregions in India ==
The following are the ecoregions in India that are included in the Global 200 ecoregions:

=== Terrestrial ===
- Chota Nagpur dry deciduous forests (India)
- Eastern Deccan Plateau moist forests (old name) or East Deccan moist deciduous forests (current name) (India)
- Eastern Himalayan alpine meadows (Bhutan, China, India, Myanmar, Nepal)
- Eastern Himalayan broadleaf forests (Bhutan, China, India, Myanmar, Nepal)
- Himalayan subtropical pine forests (Bhutan, India, Nepal, Pakistan)
- Naga-Manipuri-Chin hills moist forests (India)
- Northeast India-Myanmar pine forests (India, Myanmar)
- Rann of Kutch seasonal salt marsh (India, Pakistan)
- South Western Ghats moist deciduous forests (India)
- Sundarbans mangroves (Bangladesh, India)
- Terai-Duar savannas and grasslands (Bhutan, India, Nepal)
- Tibetan Plateau alpine shrublands and meadows (Afghanistan, China, India, Pakistan, Tajikistan)
- Western Himalayan broadleaf forests (Afghanistan, India, Nepal, Pakistan)

== See also ==
- Arid Forest Research Institute (AFRI)
