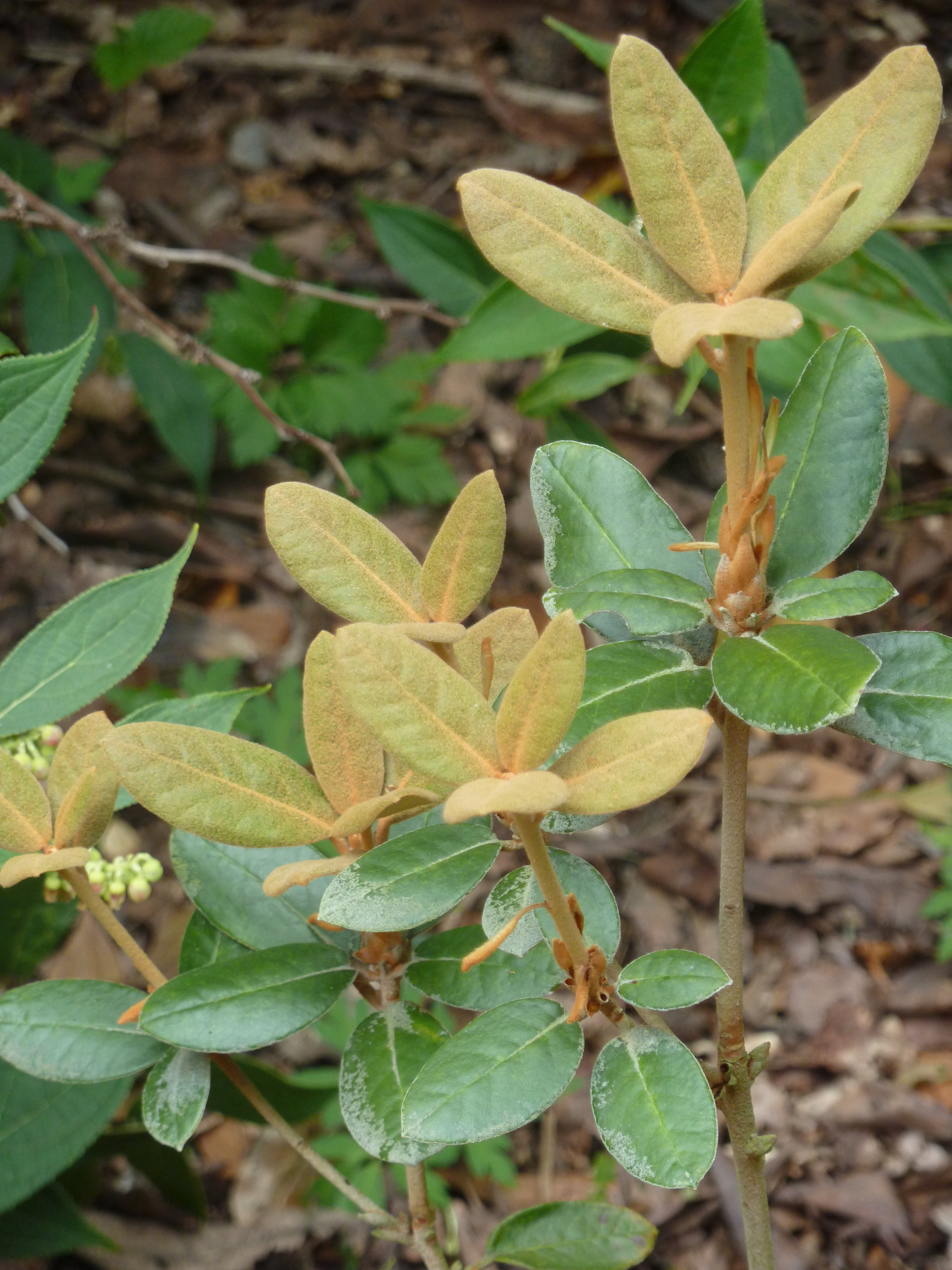
- New growth is woolly.
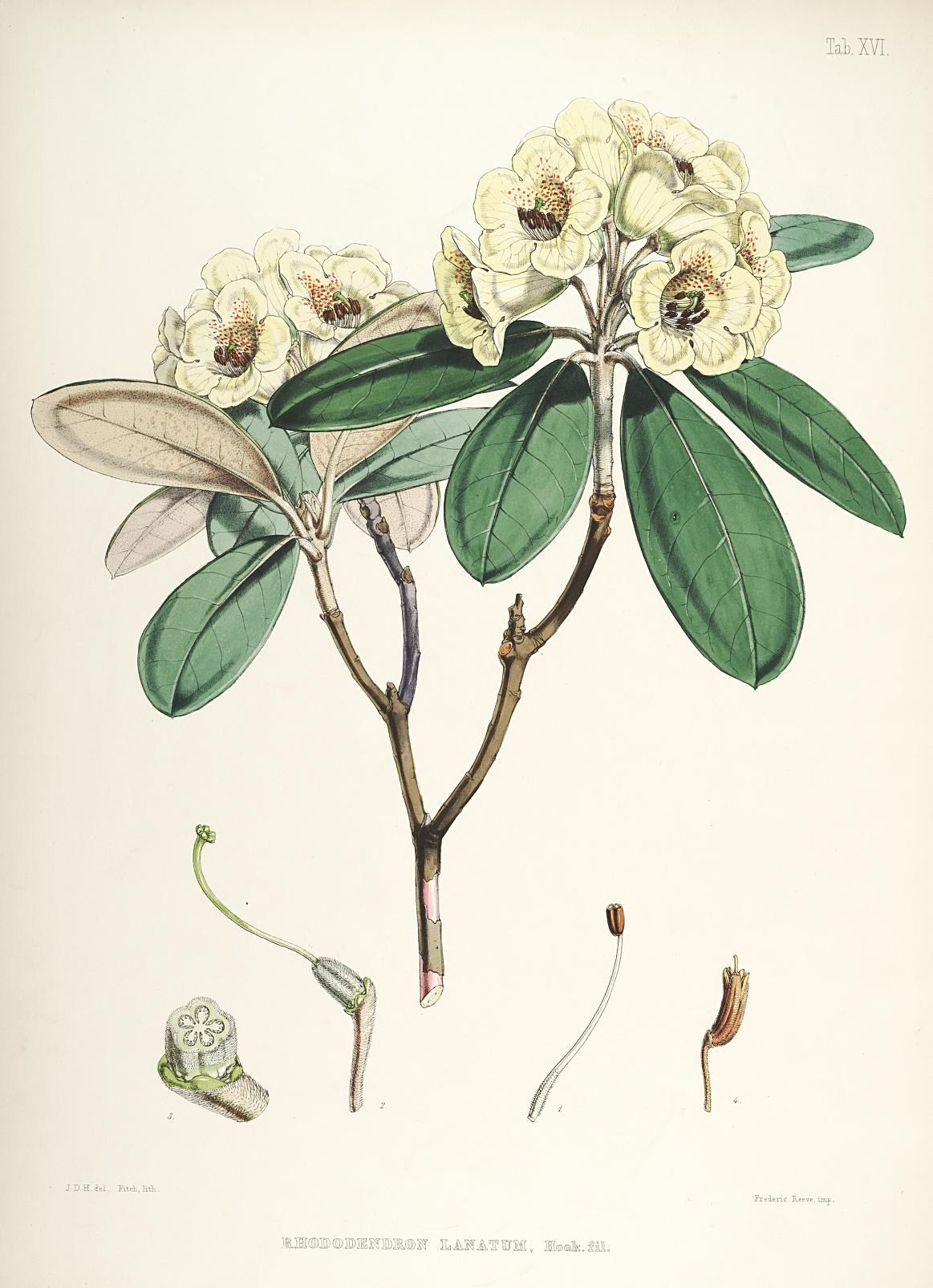
- Botanical illustration

Scientific classification
- Kingdom: Plantae
- Clade: Embryophytes
- Clade: Tracheophytes
- Clade: Spermatophytes
- Clade: Angiosperms
- Clade: Eudicots
- Clade: Asterids
- Order: Ericales
- Family: Ericaceae
- Genus: Rhododendron
- Species: R. lanatum

Binomial name
- Rhododendron lanatum Hook.f.

Synonyms
- Azalea lanata (Hook.f.) Kuntze; Rhododendron flinckii Davidian

= Rhododendron lanatum =

Species of flowering plant

Rhododendron lanatum (syn. Rhododendron flinckii), the woolly rhododendron, is a species of flowering plant in the family Ericaceae, native to the eastern Himalayas and southeastern Tibet. Occasionally found in commerce, it is a rabbit-tolerant evergreen shrub reaching 3–10 ft (1–3 m). Hardy in USDA zones 7 through 9, it is recommended as a hedge in partly shady situations.

Its young shoots and leaves are covered with a white to tawny velvety wool, giving it its scientific and common names. May flowers are typically sulphur-yellow with maroon-spotted throats, and there is a cream-flowered morph.
