= Yarlung Tsangpo arid steppe =

Ecoregion in the Tibetan Plateau

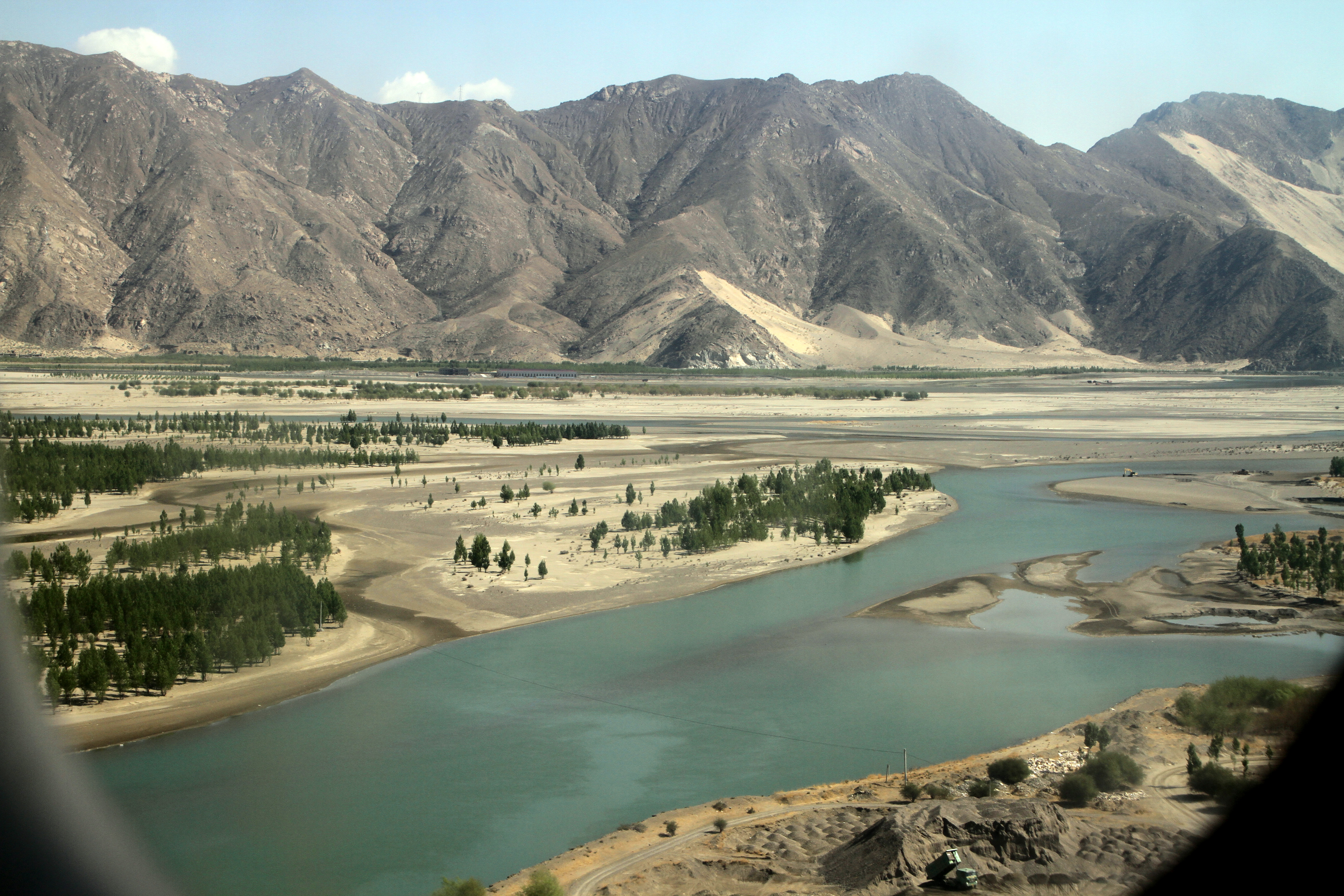
- Yarlung Tsangpo in Shannon Prefecture

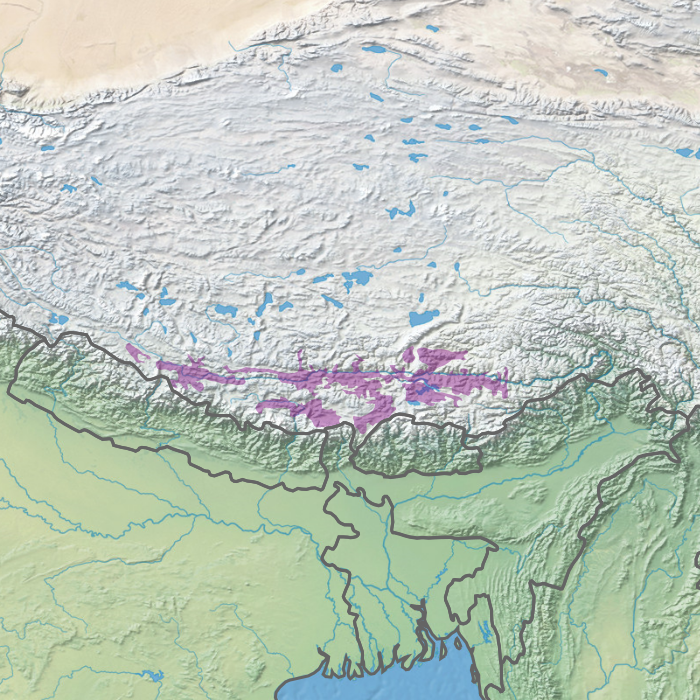
- Ecoregion territory (in purple)

Ecology
- Realm: Palearctic
- Biome: Montane grasslands and shrublands

Geography
- Area: 59,570 km^{2} (23,000 sq mi)
- Countries: China
- Coordinates: 28°45′N 90°50′E

The Yarlung Tsangpo arid steppe ecoregion (WWF ID: PA1022) covers the river valley of the Yarlung Tsangpo River on the southern edge of Tibet. The river runs parallel to the northern borders of Nepal, Bhutan and India, between the Himalayas to the south and the Tibet Plateau to the north. The river valleys are the most populated areas of Tibet, putting pressure on wildlife. The area ranges from cold desert in the west to steppe shrub land in the east; the few trees are in the lowest river valleys to the east.

== Location and description ==
The Yarlung Tsangpo runs west to east for 800 kilometres (500 mi) along the north slope of the Himalayas, but south of the Transhimalaya ranges of the Gangdise Shan and Nyenchen Tanglha Mountains. The ecoregion mostly follows the river valley and short tributary valleys, including the area north to Lhasa. Yamdrok Lake, one of the largest lakes of the Tibetan Plateau is in the region, and at Lhasa is an urban impoundment of water now protected as the Lalu Wetlands National Nature Preserve.

== Climate ==
The climate of the valleys of the ecoregion have a Subarctic climate, dry winter (Köppen climate classification Subarctic climate (Dwc)). This climate is characterized by mild summers (only 1–3 months above 10 °C (50.0 °F)) and cold winters having monthly precipitation less than one-tenth of the wettest summer month. Precipitation in the ecoregion is 200–500 mm/year, increasing from west to east. The valleys also benefit from the drying and warming effects of the katabatic wind.

== Flora and fauna ==
Vegetation in the region changes from west to east, as the river valley gently descends from cold desert, through steppe and deciduous shrub areas, to some areas of conifer-rhododendron forest in the east. The temperate slopes above the valley floors in the middle of the ecoregion are steppe and shrub communities, with species of feather grass (Stipa bungeana), fountain grass (Pennisetum flaccidum), needlegrass (Aristida triesta), and other grasses and shrubs. Above 4,400 meters, vegetation grades into cold steppe species of feather grass (Stipa purpurea) and shrubs such as shrubby cinquefoil (Potentilla fruticosa) and honeysuckles (Lonicera tibetica). Above 5,000 meters, some areas of stable soil support species of Kobresia sedges, and cushion plants.

== See also ==
- List of ecoregions in China
