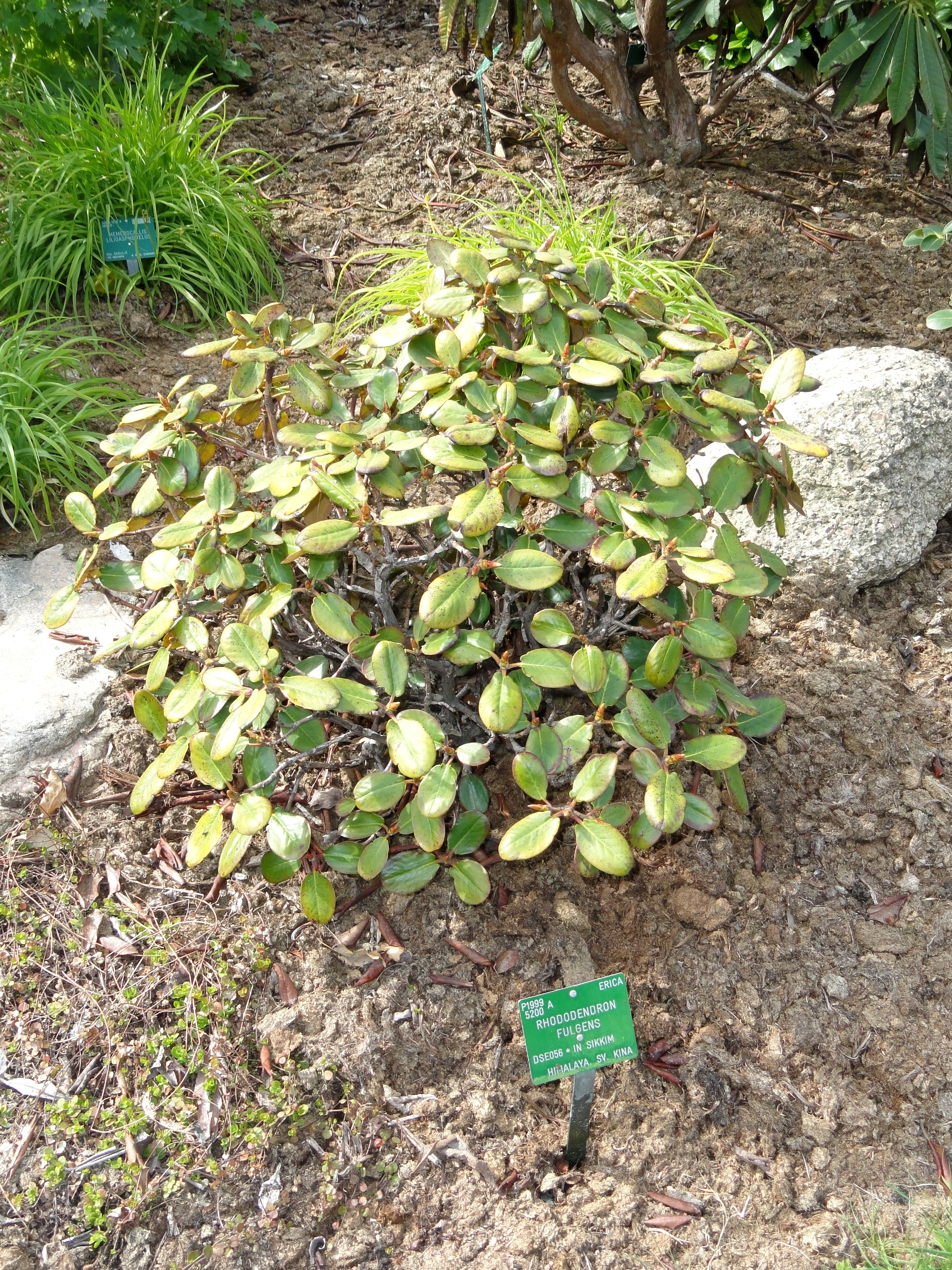

Scientific classification
- Kingdom: Plantae
- Clade: Tracheophytes
- Clade: Angiosperms
- Clade: Eudicots
- Clade: Asterids
- Order: Ericales
- Family: Ericaceae
- Genus: Rhododendron
- Species: R. fulgens

Binomial name
- Rhododendron fulgens Hook.f.

Synonyms
- Azalea fulgens (Hook.f.) Kuntze

= Rhododendron fulgens =

Species of plant

Rhododendron fulgens (猩红杜鹃) is a rhododendron species native to Bhutan, northeast India, Nepal, Sikkim, southern Tibet, and northern Myanmar, where it grows at elevations of 3700–4500 meters. It is a shrub that grows to 1.5–4 m in height, with leathery leaves that are oblong-ovate to obovate, 6–11 by 4.5–7 cm in size. Flowers are red.

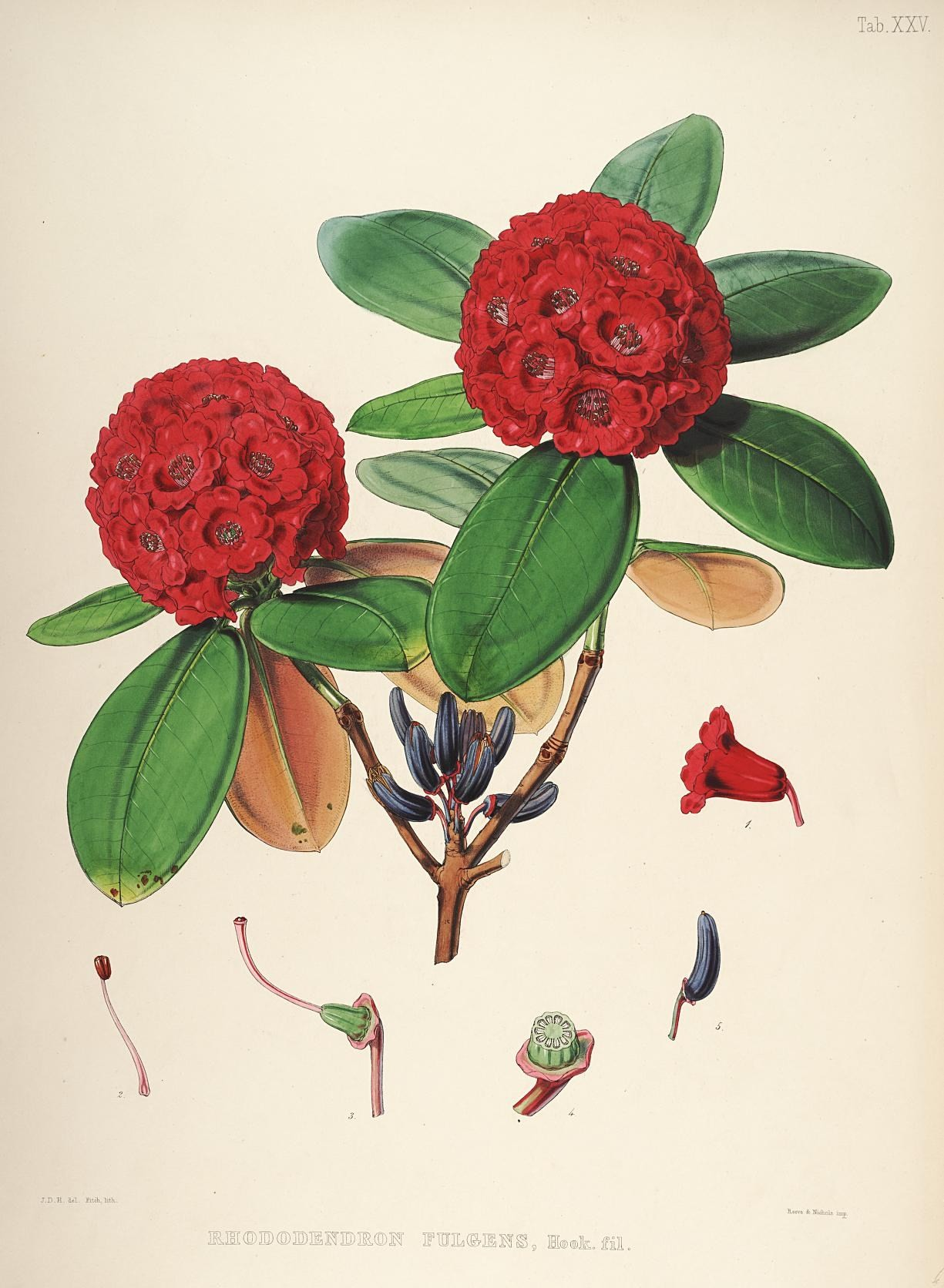
Illustration
