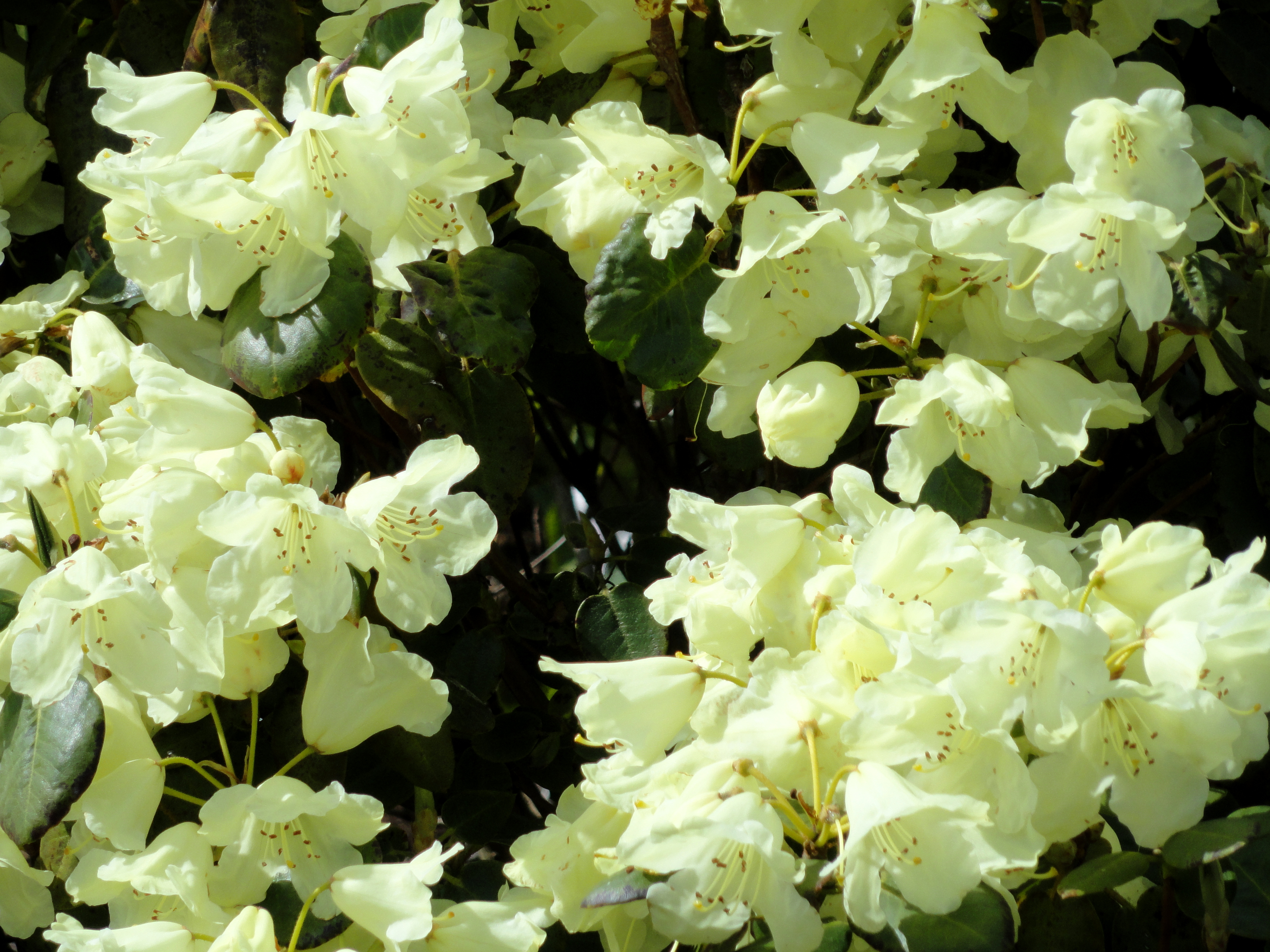

Scientific classification
- Kingdom: Plantae
- Clade: Tracheophytes
- Clade: Angiosperms
- Clade: Eudicots
- Clade: Asterids
- Order: Ericales
- Family: Ericaceae
- Genus: Rhododendron
- Subgenus: Rhododendron subg. Hymenanthes
- Section: Rhododendron sect. Ponticum
- Species: R. campylocarpum

Binomial name
- Rhododendron campylocarpum Hook.f.

Synonyms
- Azalea campylocarpa (Hook.f.) Kuntze

= Rhododendron campylocarpum =

Species of plant

Rhododendron campylocarpum is a rhododendron species. It is native to eastern Nepal, Sikkim, Bhutan, Arunachal Pradesh, southeastern Tibet, and southwestern China, where it grows at elevations of 3,000–4,000 m (9,800–13,100 ft). It is a shrub that grows to 2–3 m (6 ft 7 in – 9 ft 10 in) in height, with leathery leaves that are suborbicular or ovate-elliptic to oblong-elliptic, 4–8.5 cm (1.6–3.3 in) long by 2.5–4 cm (1.0–1.6 in) wide. Its flowers are yellow. It is placed in section Ponticum.

== Subspecies ==
As of February 2024, Plants of the World Online accepted two subspecies:

- Rhododendron campylocarpum subsp. caloxanthum (Balf.f. & Farrer) D.F.Chamb. – northwestern Yunnan and northern Myanmar
- Rhododendron campylocarpum subsp. campylocarpum – central and eastern Himalayas and southern and eastern Tibet
