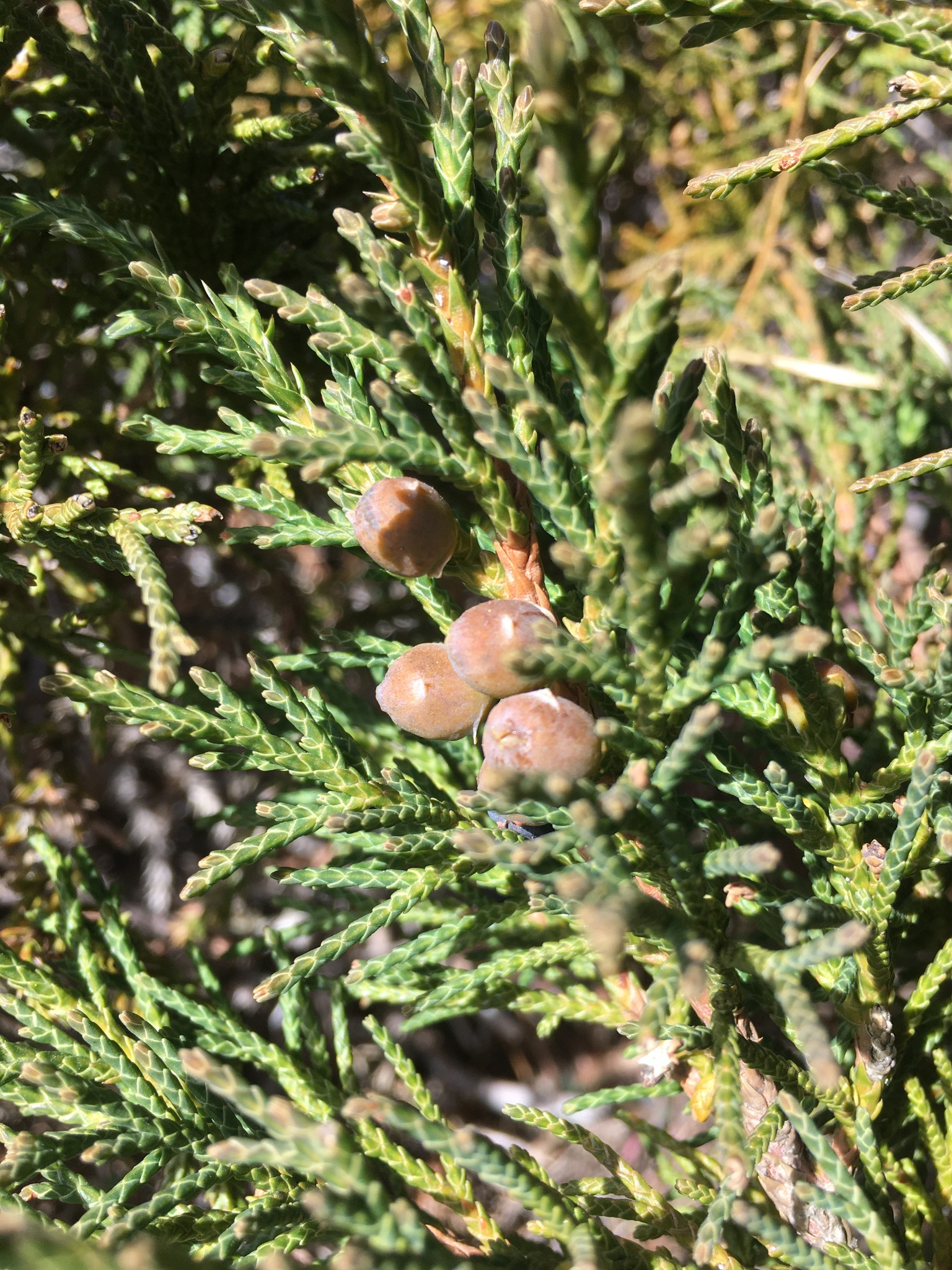

Conservation status
- Least Concern (IUCN 3.1)

Scientific classification
- Kingdom: Plantae
- Clade: Embryophytes
- Clade: Tracheophytes
- Clade: Gymnosperms
- Division: Pinophyta
- Class: Pinopsida
- Order: Cupressales
- Family: Cupressaceae
- Genus: Juniperus
- Section: Juniperus sect. Sabina
- Species: J. indica

Binomial name
- Juniperus indica Bertol.

Synonyms
- Juniperus wallichiana Hook. f. & Thomson ex Parl.; Juniperus wallichiana Hook.f. & Thomson ex E.Brandis; Sabina indica (Bertol.) L.K.Fu & Y.F.Yu; Sabina wallichiana (Hook.f. & Thomson ex E.Brandis) W.C.Cheng & L.K.Fu

= Juniperus indica =

Species of conifer

Juniperus indica, the black juniper, is a juniper native to high-altitude climates in the Himalaya, occurring in Pakistan, India, Nepal, Bhutan and China.

It is of interest as the highest elevation woody plant known, reported growing as high as 5,200 metres (17,100 feet) in southern Tibet, the lowest limit being 2,600 m (8,500 ft).

It is a shrub growing to 50–200 centimetres (20–79 in) tall, with largely horizontal branching. The leaves are dark gray-green, dimorphic, with adult plants having mostly scale-like leaves 1–3 millimetres (1/16–1/8 in) long, while young plants have mostly needle-like leaves 5–8 mm long, but needle-like leaves can also be found on shaded shoots of adult plants. The leaves are borne in whorls of three on strong stout main stem shoots, and opposite pairs on thinner, slower-growing shoots. It is dioecious, with male (pollen) and female (seed) cones on separate plants. The mature seed cones are ovoid, berry-like, 6–10 mm long, glossy black, and contain a single seed; the seeds are dispersed by birds which eat the cones, digest the fleshy cone pulp, and excrete the seeds in their droppings.
