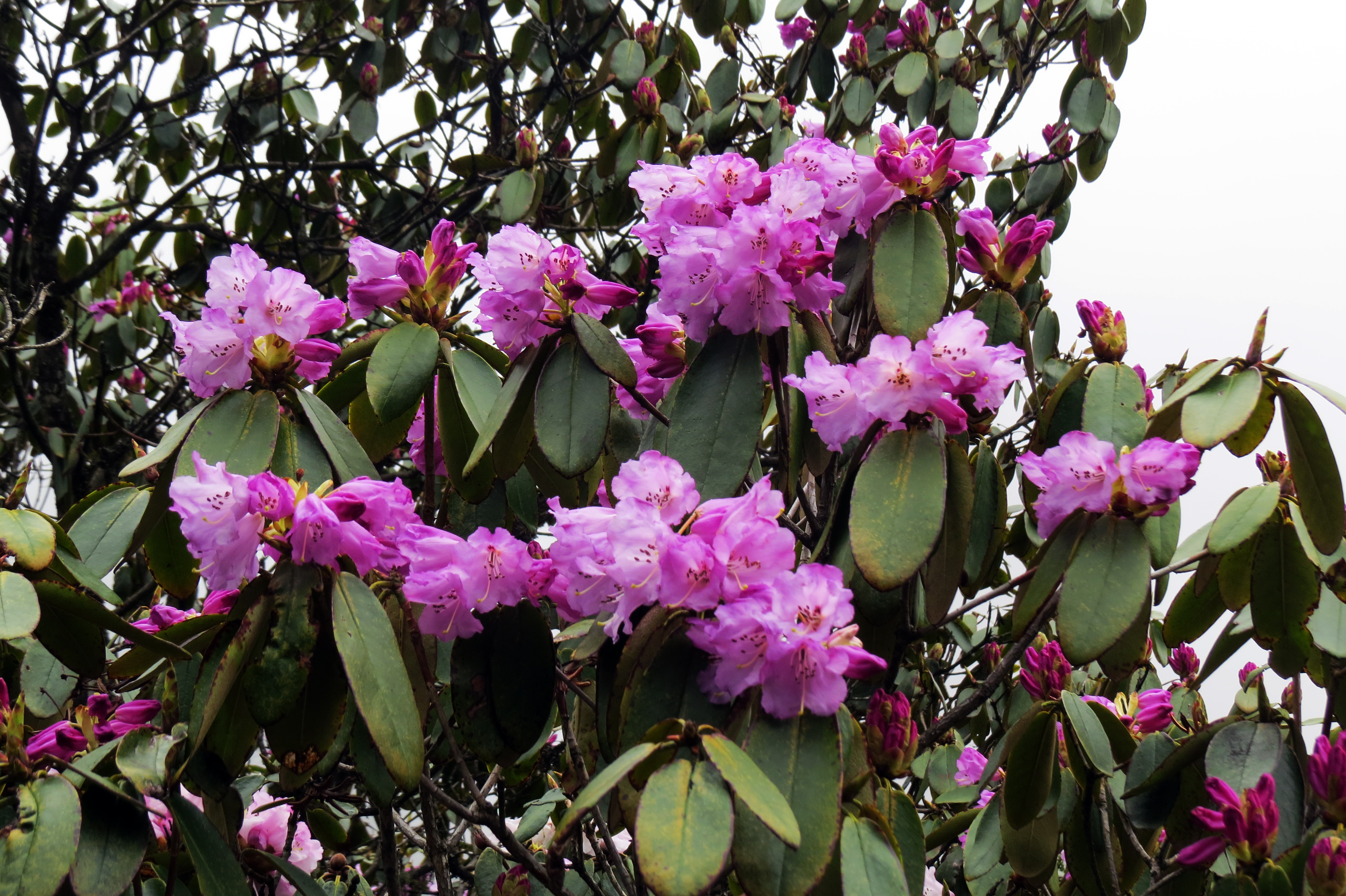
- In bloom
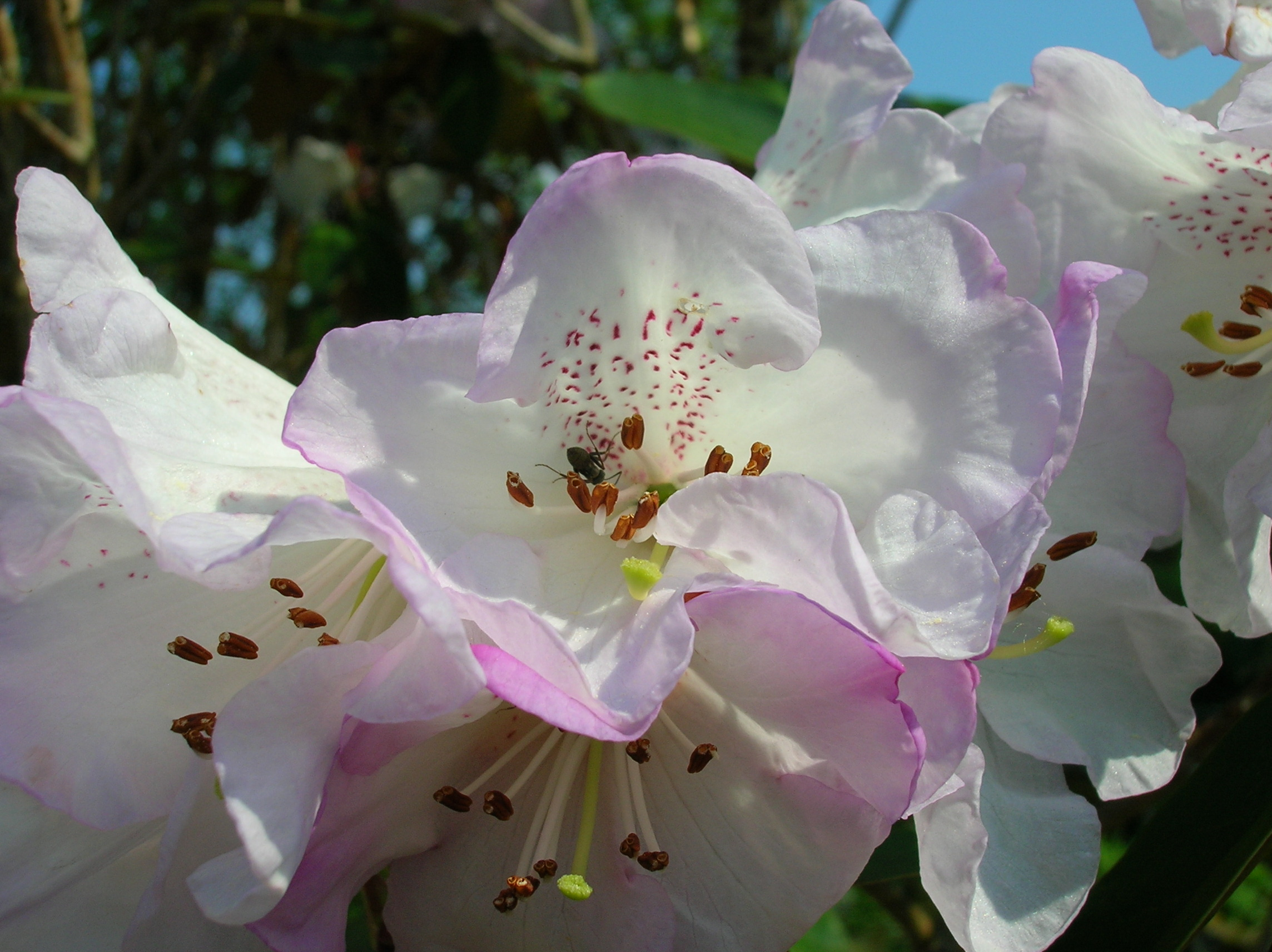
- Close-up of flowers, which can range from white to dark pink

Scientific classification
- Kingdom: Plantae
- Clade: Embryophytes
- Clade: Tracheophytes
- Clade: Angiosperms
- Clade: Eudicots
- Clade: Asterids
- Order: Ericales
- Family: Ericaceae
- Genus: Rhododendron
- Species: R. campanulatum

Binomial name
- Rhododendron campanulatum D.Don

Synonyms
- List: Azalea campanulata (D.Don) Kuntze; Rhododendron batemanii Hook.f.; Rhododendron campanulatum var. album-violaceum Van Geert; Rhododendron campanulatum var. alexandria Van Geert; Rhododendron campanulatum var. amabile Van Geert; Rhododendron campanulatum var. leopoldii Verschaff. ex Van Geert; Rhododendron campanulatum var. lilacinum Verschaff. ex Van Geert; Rhododendron campanulatum var. mirendum Van Geert; Rhododendron campanulatum var. purpureum-maculatum Van Geert; Rhododendron campanulatum var. rubrum-grandiflorum Van Geert; Rhododendron campanulatum var. superbum Van Geert; Rhododendron campanulatum var. violaceum Verschaff. ex Van Geert; Rhododendron campanulatum var. violaceum-pallidum Verschaff. ex Van Geert; Rhododendron campanulatum var. wallichii (Hook.f.) Hook.; Rhododendron edgarii Gamble; Rhododendron heftii Davidian; Rhododendron mutabile Webb ex Royle; Rhododendron nobile Wall.; Rhododendron planifolium Nutt.; Rhododendron wallichii Hook.f.

= Rhododendron campanulatum =

Species of flowering plant

Rhododendron campanulatum, the bell-flowered rhododendron or bell rhododendron, is a species of flowering plant in the family Ericaceae. It is a shrub or tree native to northern and northeastern India, Nepal, Bhutan, Sikkim, and southern Tibet in China.

== Description ==
Growing to 2–4 m (6.6–13.1 ft) in height, it is an evergreen shrub with leathery leaves that are elliptic to oblong-obovate, 7–12 by 2.5–5 cm in size.

The flowers are purple-red to white, with red spots. They bloom from April to June in the Himalayas, and May to June in Tibet.

The tree fruits from July to September.

== Taxonomy ==
The tree is called zhong hua du Juan (钟花杜鹃) in Chinese.

== Habitat ==
Rhododendron campanulatum is native to northern and Northeast India, Nepal, Bhutan, Sikkim, and southern Tibet where it grows at elevations of 3,000–4,300 m (9,800–14,100 ft).

It is the state flower of Himachal Pradesh.

In the western Himalayas and western Nepal it is often associated with Jacquemont birch (Betula utilis subsp. jacquemontii), where it grows in thickets in open birch forests.
