= Central Tibetan Plateau alpine steppe =

Ecoregion in the Tibetan Plateau

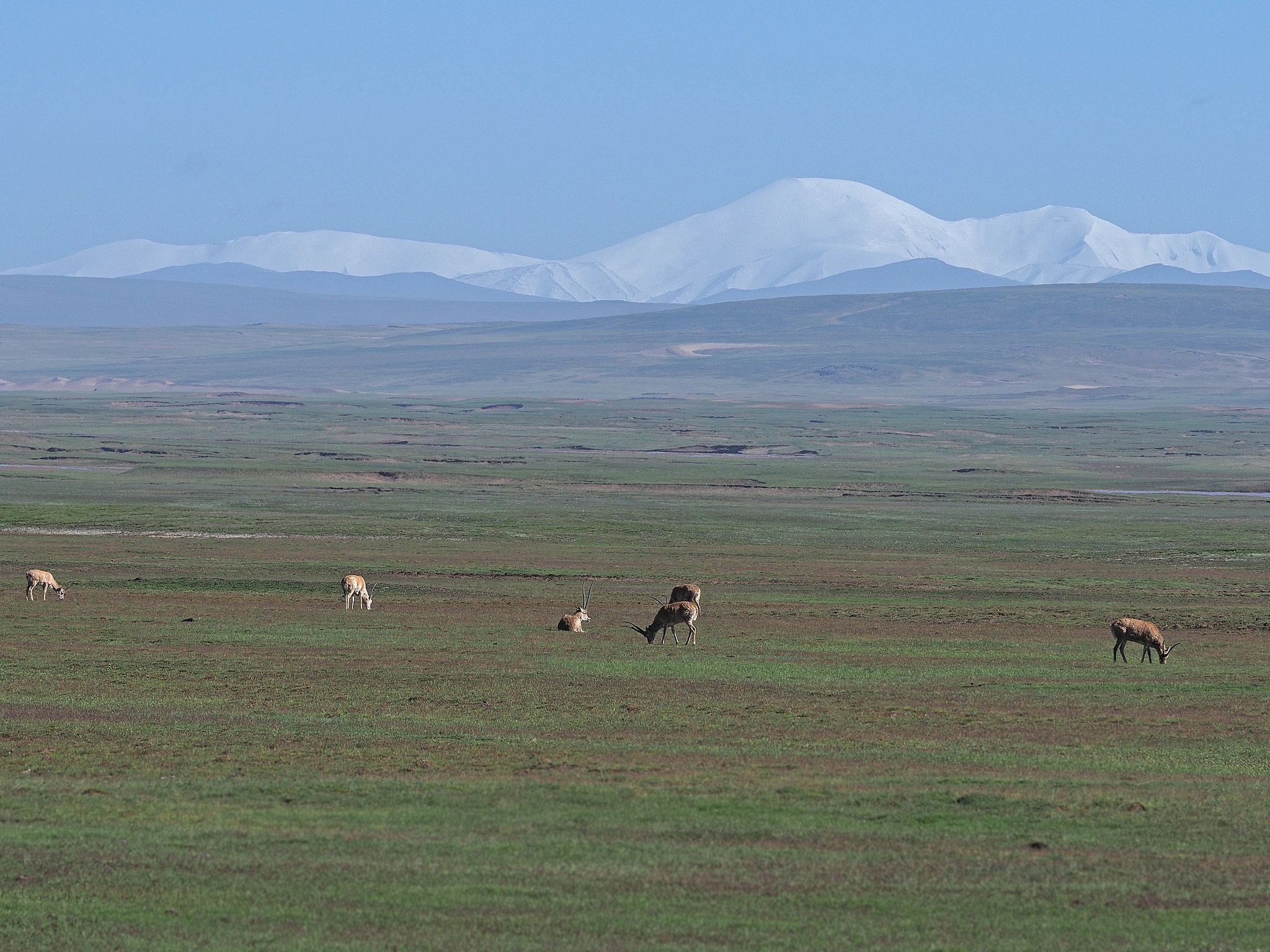
- Tibetan Antelope, Gyêgu, Tibet

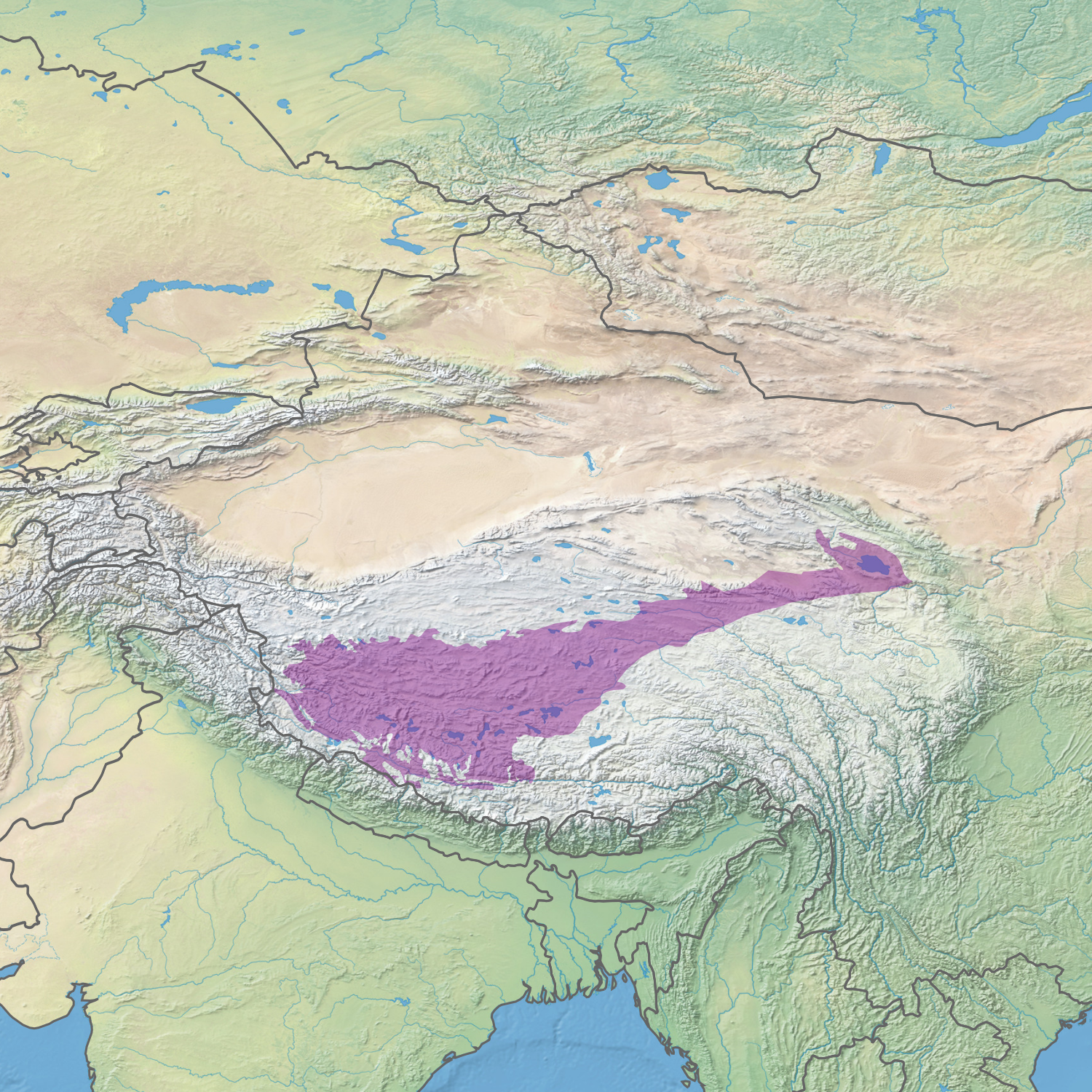
- Ecoregion territory (in purple)

Ecology
- Realm: Palearctic
- Biome: Montane grasslands and shrublands

Geography
- Area: 629,626 km^{2} (243,100 mi^{2})
- Countries: China
- Coordinates: 34°00′N 92°00′E

The Central Tibetan Plateau alpine steppe ecoregion (WWF ID: PA1002) covers the high alpine plateau that stretches over 1,600 kilometres (1,000 mi) across the Tibetan Plateau to Qinghai Lake in China. Because of the high altitude—much it over 5,000 metres (16,000 ft)—the region is a cold, arid desert that is only 20% covered with steppe and meadow vegetation. The area has been relatively free from human development due to the hostile climate and unsuitability for agriculture. The ecosystem is relatively intact, and supports herds of wild antelope, sheep, deer, and gazelles.

== Location and description ==
Towards the west, the ecoregion is on the southern Changtang plateau, a part of the greater Qinghai-Tibet Plateau. This area is a high basin between the even higher Kunlun Mountains to the north and the Himalayas to the south. The plateau tilts gently down towards the southeast, with elevations of 6,000 meters on the Changtang in the northwest to 3,200 meters at Qingai Lake in Qinghai. The terrain is generally rolling plains. At wide intervals are shallow, brackish lakes.

== Climate ==
The climate of most of the ecoregion is Tundra climate (Köppen climate classification ET), characterized as a climate in which at least one month has an average temperature high enough to melt snow (0 °C or 32 °F), but no month with an average temperature over (10 °C or 50 °F). Precipitation ranges from 400 mm/year in the northwest to 200 mm/year in the southeast.

== Flora and fauna ==
Vegetation zones in the region are greatly affected by elevation and precipitation, but are generally sparsely covered. Precipitation controls which alpine zones will have meadow, steppe, or cold desert vegetation Higher steppe elevations support sedges (Carex), with purple feathergrass (Stipa purpurea) increasing in lower altitudes. Wetter areas will support cushion plants and some woody forbs, but there are no trees on the plateau. Small stands of brush and trees can be found in the low, southern river valleys.

The area supports herds of wild Tibetan antelope, Chinese blue sheep (Bharal), several species of deer, and gazelles.

== See also ==
- Ecoregions in China
