= Montane grasslands and shrublands =

Biome defined by the World Wildlife Fund

Montane grasslands and shrublands extent

Montane grasslands and shrublands are a biome defined by the World Wide Fund for Nature. The term montane in the name of the biome refers to high elevation, rather than the ecological term that denotes the region below the treeline. The biome includes high-elevation (montane and alpine) grasslands and shrublands around the world, including the puna and páramo in South America, subalpine heath in New Guinea and East Africa, steppes of the Tibetan plateaus, and other similar subalpine habitats. Drier subtropical montane grasslands, savannas, and woodlands include the Ethiopian Highlands, the Zambezian montane grasslands and woodlands, and the montane habitats of southeastern Africa.

The páramos of the northern Andes are the most extensive examples of the habitat type. Although ecoregion biotas are most diverse in the Andes, these ecosystems are distinctive wherever they occur in the tropics. The heathlands and moorlands of East Africa (e.g., Mount Kilimanjaro, Mount Kenya, Rwenzori Mountains), Mount Kinabalu of Borneo, and the Central Range of New Guinea are all limited in extent, isolated, and support endemic plants and animals. The plants and animals of tropical montane páramos display striking adaptations to cool, wet conditions and intense sunlight. Around the world, characteristic plants of these habitats display features such as rosette structures, waxy surfaces, and abundant pilosity.

The montane grasslands of the Tibetan Plateau still support relatively intact migrations of Tibetan antelope (Pantholops hodgsoni) and kiang, or Tibetan wild ass (Equus hemionus). A unique feature of many tropical páramos is the presence of giant rosette plants from a variety of plant families, such as Lobelia (Africa), Puya (South America), Cyathea (New Guinea), and Argyroxiphium (Hawai'i). These plant forms can reach elevations of 4,500–4,600 metres (14,800–15,100 ft) above sea level.

== See also ==
- Montane ecosystems – Ecosystems found in mountains
- Steppe – Ecoregion of plain grasslands without trees
