= Pant Wildlife Sanctuary =

Wildlife sanctuary in Bihar, India

- पंत वन्यजीव अभयारण्य
- IUCN category IV (habitat/species management area)
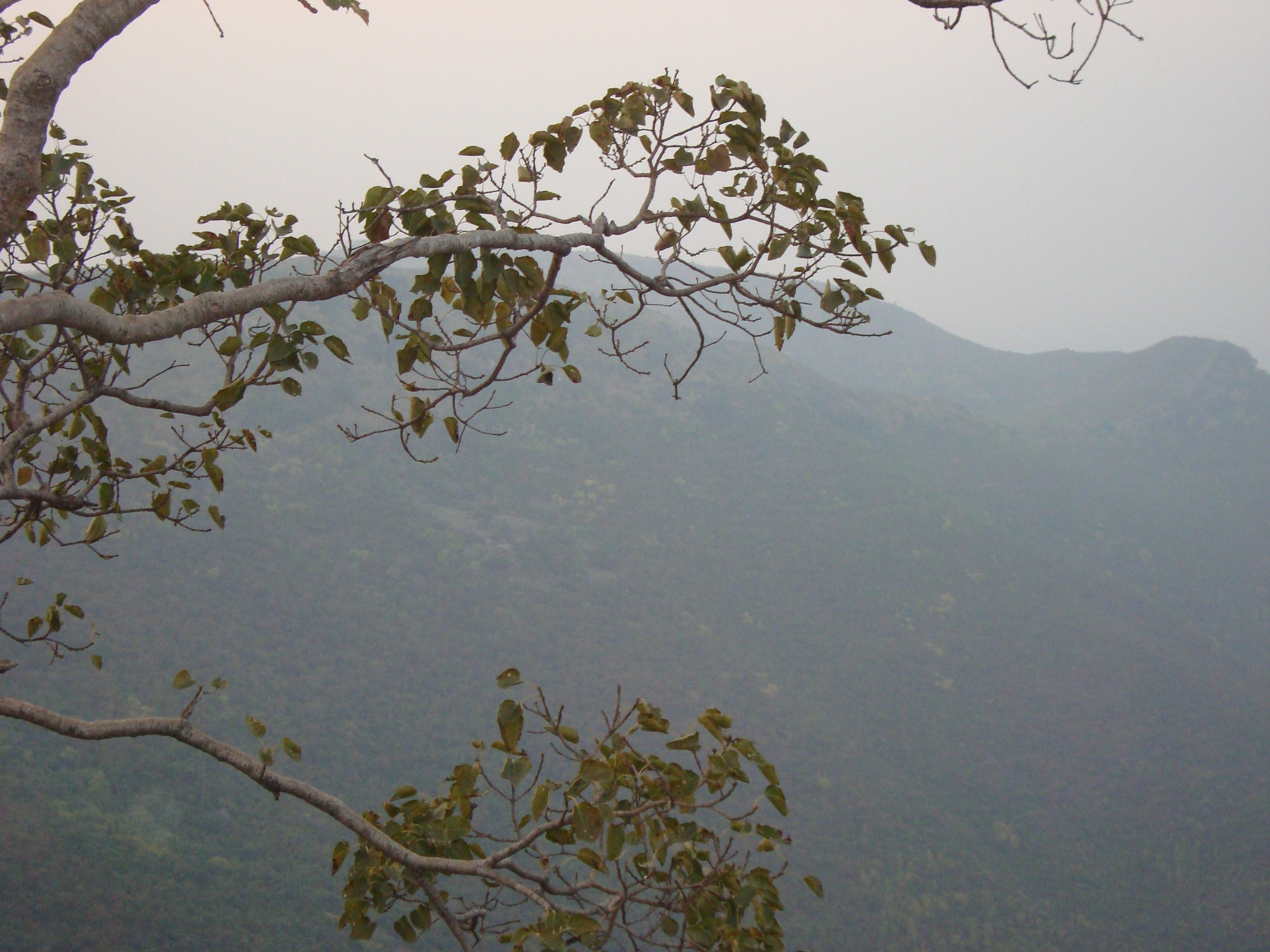

- Location within Bihar Location within India
- Interactive map of Pant Wildlife Sanctuary
- Location: Nalanda district, Bihar, India
- Nearest city: Rajgir
- Coordinates: 24.9928°N 85.4233°E
- Area: 3,584 ha (13.84 sq mi)
- Established: 1978
- Administrator: Chief Wildlife Warden, State Forest Department

Pant Wildlife Sanctuary is a wildlife sanctuary in India, situated near Rajgir in Nalanda district, Bihar, India. It is under the Nalanda forest division.

== Climate ==
The climate is normal for the Nalanda district. There are three distinct seasons, summer (March to May) when temperature remains 44° C - 20° C, winter (October to February) when temperature remains 28° C - 6° C, and Monsoon (June to September) when rainfall is 1860 mm. The average summer temperature is 29 °C (84 °F), and the average winter temperature is 17 °C (63 °F).

== Geography ==
This wildlife sanctuary represents a remnant patch of forests nestled in the picturesque Rajgir Hills within the South Gangetic Plain. This sanctuary lies between latitudes 24°55’ and 25°05’ N and longitude 85°6’ and 85°30’ E in Nalanda District of Bihar and extends over an area of 3584 hectares or 35.84 sq. km. For protection, this forest was notified as Pant Wildlife Sanctuary Rajgir in 1978.

== Landscape ==
The landscape of Pant Wildlife Sanctuary is uneven terrain enclosed by five mountains – Ratnagiri, Vipulgiri, Vaibhargiri, Songiri and Udaygiri.

== Flora and fauna ==
The forests of this sanctuary intercept rainfall and help recharge ground water aquifer, protect rivers and streams against siltation by minimising soil erosion and the sanctuary has ecologically important species of flora and fauna, with mixed deciduous forest. Wild boar (Sus scrofa), nilgai (Boselaphus tragocamelus), chital (Axis axis), red junglefowl (Gallus gallus murghi), Indian crested porcupine (Hystrix indica), Indian hare (Lepus nigricollis), northern plains gray langur (Semnopithecus entellus), rhesus macaque (Macaca mulatta), and golden jackal (Canis aureus) are the species of vital importance in this sanctuary, besides some of the endangered species like Indian python (Python molurus) etc. are also found in the sanctuary.

The sanctuary has substantial faunal diversity with 28 species of large mammals, 183 species of birds, 39 species of reptiles, 11 species of amphibians, 13 species of fish and 51 species of butterfly, many of whom are threatened.

== Eco-sensitive zone ==
In 2015 an eco-sensitive zone was designated around the sanctuary. The eco-sensitive zone extends from 100 metres to three kilometres from the boundary of the sanctuary, covering an area 2954.5 hectares or 29.545 sq. km. The Bihar state government was directed to create a zonal master plan to document and preserve forests, water bodies, agricultural areas, and places of worship, to regulate development, land use, infrastructure, and industries, and to restore denuded areas and water catchments within the zone.

== Administration ==
It is administered by Nalanda forest division under the Nalanda district Administration, Bihar.

== Rajgir Zoo Safari ==
Rajgir Zoo Safari is an under construction Safari park at Rajgir in Indian state Bihar. Chief minister of Bihar Nitish Kumar laid the foundation stone on 17 January 2017. The aim was to complete it by the end of 2019. It is being built over 480 acres of land and its estimated budget is RS 177 crores. Here the animals will not be in cages but they will be free to roam over a forest area and visitors will be allowed to watch them from a secured environment-friendly vehicle. It will be located between the Vaibhgiri and Songiri mountain in the forest area, about half a kilometre from the Rajgir-Gaya road which is adjacent to the Pant Wildlife Sanctuary at the foothills of Jethian hill.

== See also ==
- Rajgir
- Nalanda district
- Rajgir Zoo Safari
- Protected areas of Bihar
- Fauna of Bihar
- Flora of Bihar
