= Lower Gangetic Plains moist deciduous forests =

Ecoregion of India and Bangladesh

Lower Gangetic plains moist deciduous forests
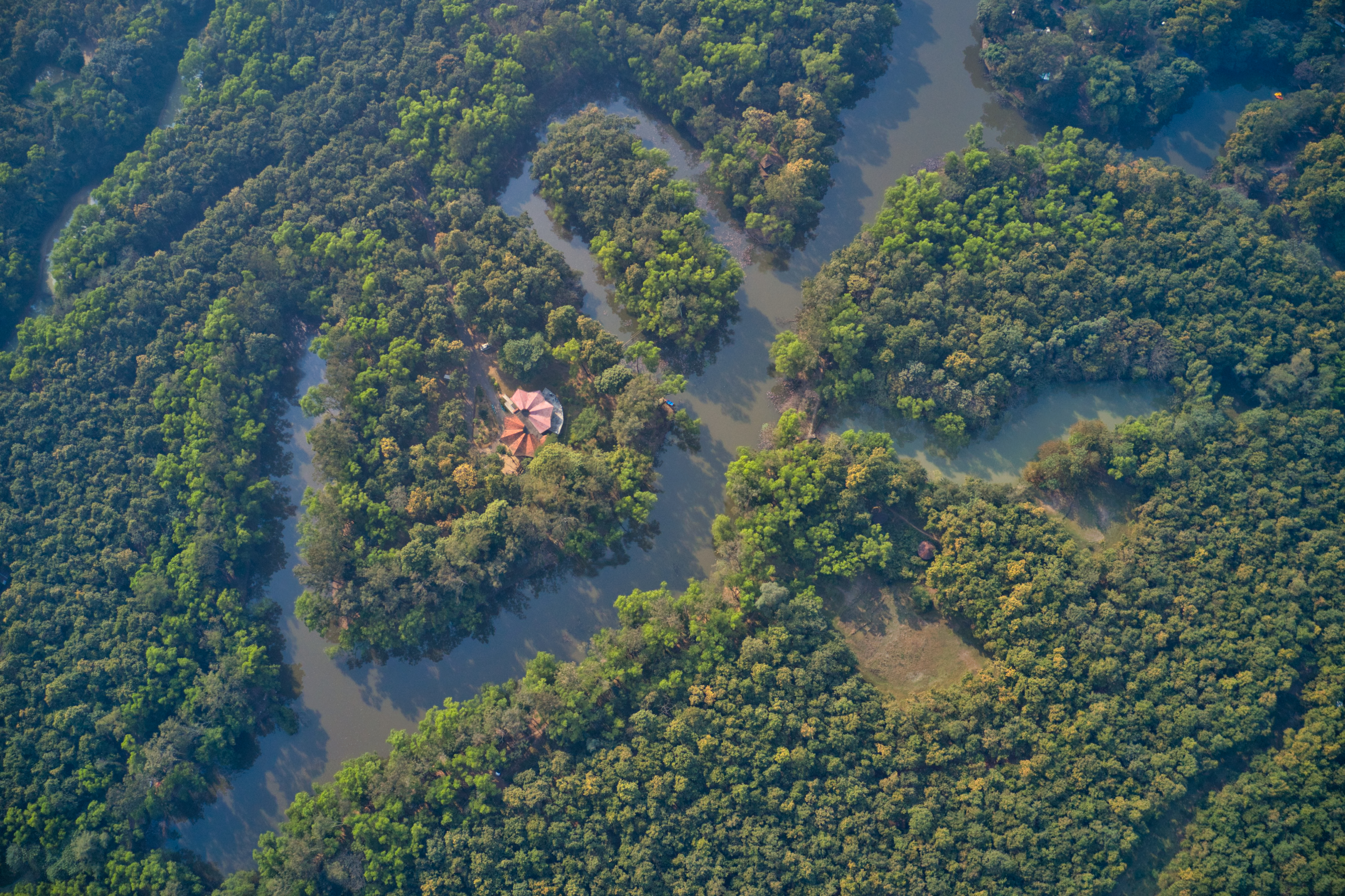
- Bhawal National Park

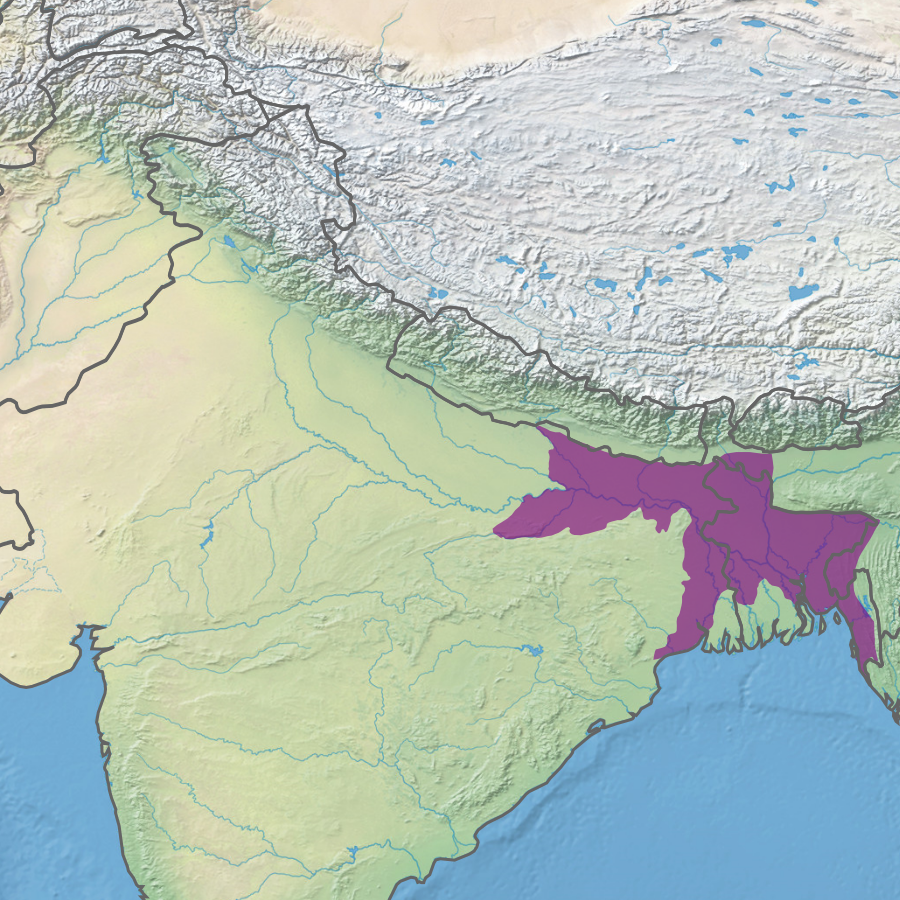
- Ecoregion territory (in purple)

Ecology
- Realm: Indomalayan
- Biome: tropical and subtropical moist broadleaf forests
- Borders: List: Brahmaputra Valley semi-evergreen forests; Chhota-Nagpur dry deciduous forests; Eastern highlands moist deciduous forests; Himalayan subtropical broadleaf forests; Meghalaya subtropical forests; Mizoram–Manipur–Kachin rain forests; Myanmar coastal rain forests; Myanmar Coast mangroves; Narmada Valley dry deciduous forests; Odisha semi-evergreen forests; Sundarbans mangroves; Sundarbans freshwater swamp forests; Terai–Duar savanna and grasslands; Upper Gangetic Plains moist deciduous forests
- Bird species: 380+
- Mammal species: 126

Geography
- Area: 254,100 km^{2} (98,100 mi^{2})
- Countries: Bangladesh; India; Myanmar
- States: Assam; Bihar; Odisha; Tripura; Uttar Pradesh, West Bengal
- Coordinates: 24°02′N 89°53′E

Conservation
- Conservation status: Critical/endangered
- Protected: 2.76%

The Lower Gangetic Plains moist deciduous forests is a tropical and subtropical moist broadleaf forests ecoregion of Bangladesh and India. The ecoregion covers an area of 254,100 square kilometres (98,100 sq mi), comprising most of Bangladesh and the Indian states of West Bengal, Bihar and Tripura, and extending into adjacent states of Odisha, Uttar Pradesh and a tiny part of Assam, as well as adjacent western Myanmar.

== Geography ==
The Lower Gangetic Plains moist deciduous forests extends across the alluvial plain of the lower Ganges and Brahmaputra rivers, which form the world's largest river delta. The ecoregion is currently one of the most densely populated regions on earth, and the forests have largely been replaced with intensive agriculture.

The ecoregion is bounded on the east and northeast by montane tropical rain forests; the Mizoram–Manipur–Kachin rain forests covers the Chin Hills and Chittagong Hills to the east, extending into Myanmar and other states of Northeast India, while the Meghalaya subtropical forests covers the Garo-Khasi-Jaintia Hills of Meghalaya and southern Assam, and almost defines the Bangladesh border with Northeast India. To the north, the ecoregion extends to the base of the Himalayas, where it is bounded by the Terai–Duar savanna and grasslands. The upper portion of the Brahmaputra valley in Assam is home to the humid lowland Brahmaputra Valley semi-evergreen forests. To the northwest, the forests are bounded by the Upper Gangetic Plains moist deciduous forests. The dry Chota Nagpur dry deciduous forests lie on the Chota Nagpur Plateau to the southwest. The Sundarbans freshwater swamp forests and Sundarbans mangroves ecoregions lie in the swampy, semi-brackish and brackish southern reaches of the Ganges-Brahmaputra Delta bordering the Bay of Bengal.

The ecoregion is home to several large cities, including Kolkata, Dhaka, Patna, and Chittagong.

== Climate ==
The climate of the ecoregion is tropical and humid. Most of the annual rainfall comes during the southwest monsoon from June to September.

== Flora ==
The natural vegetation is mostly semi-evergreen forest.

The upper canopy is predominantly of deciduous trees, with a lower storey of evergreen trees. Characteristic trees in disturbed forests are Bombax ceiba together with Albizia procera, Duabanga sonneratioides, and Sterculia villosa. As forests mature sal (Shorea robusta) becomes predominant, but most of the remaining forests do not mature to climax stage because of human disturbance. Where annual fires occur frequently during the dry season, fire-hardy trees and shrubs Zizyphus mauritiana, Madhuca latifolia, Aegle marmelos, Butea monosperma, Terminalia tomentosa, and Ochna pumila are common.

Riparian forests are typically an Acacia-Dalbergia association, with Acacia catechu, Dalbergia sissoo, Albizia procera, Bombax ceiba, and Sterculia villosa.

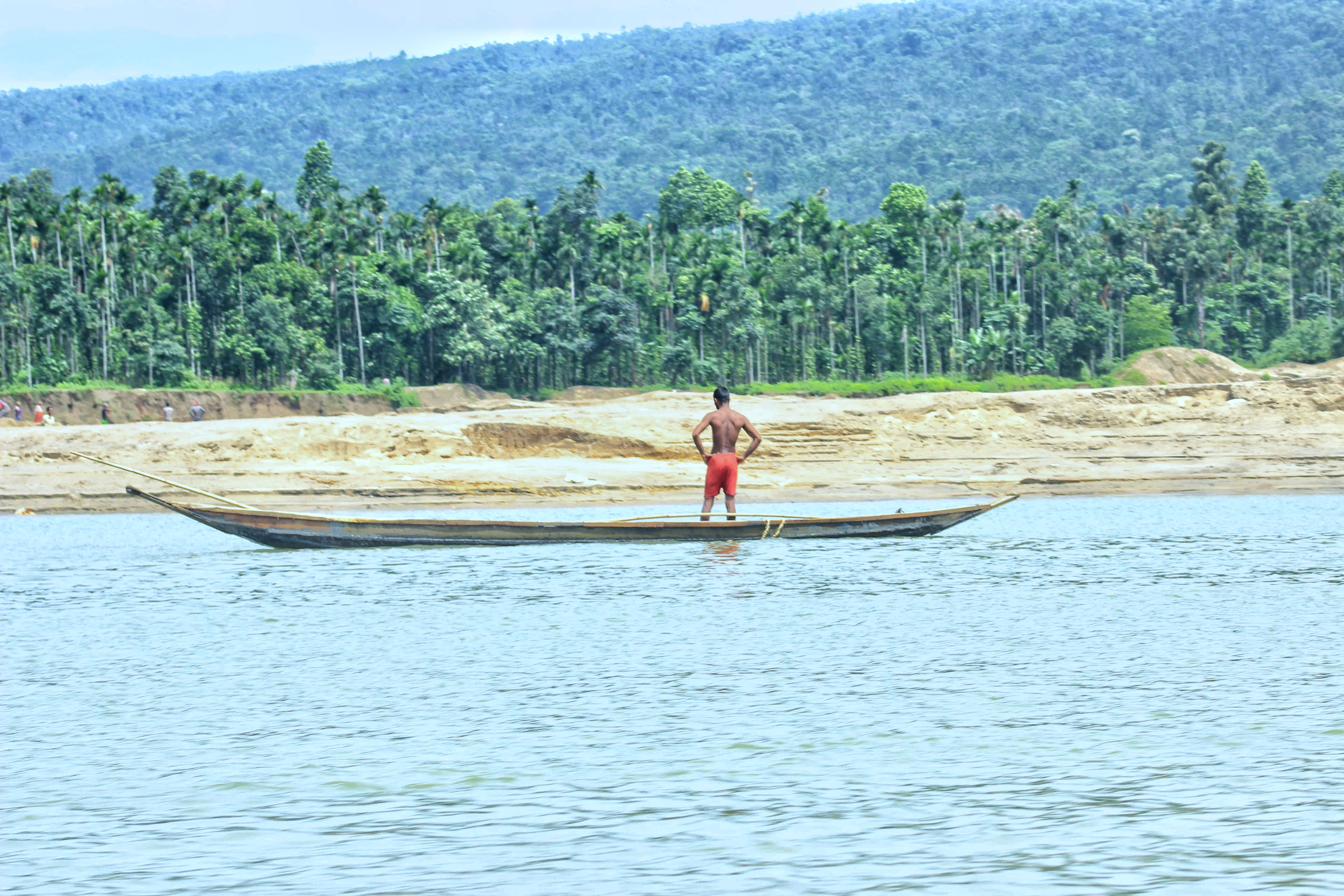

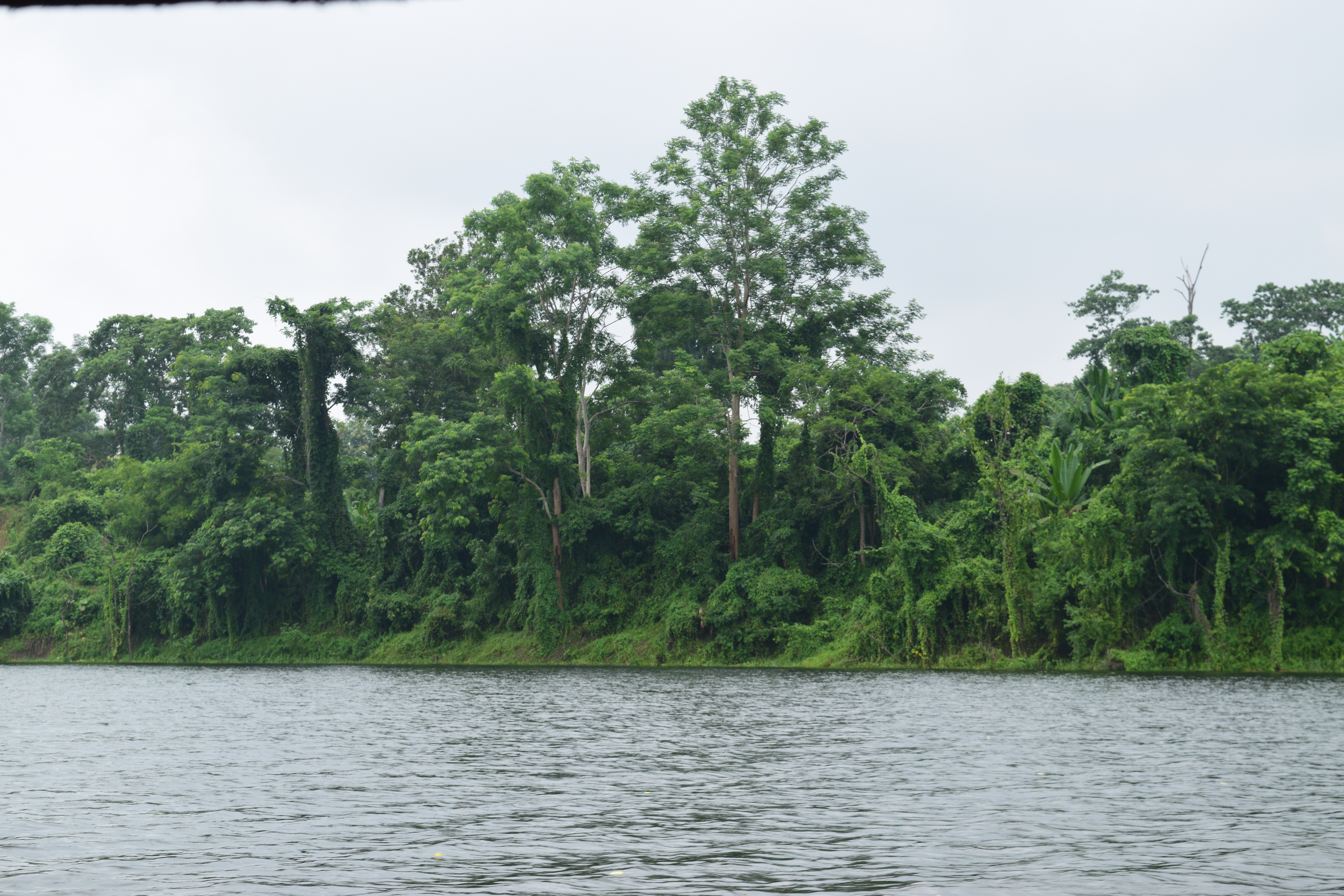

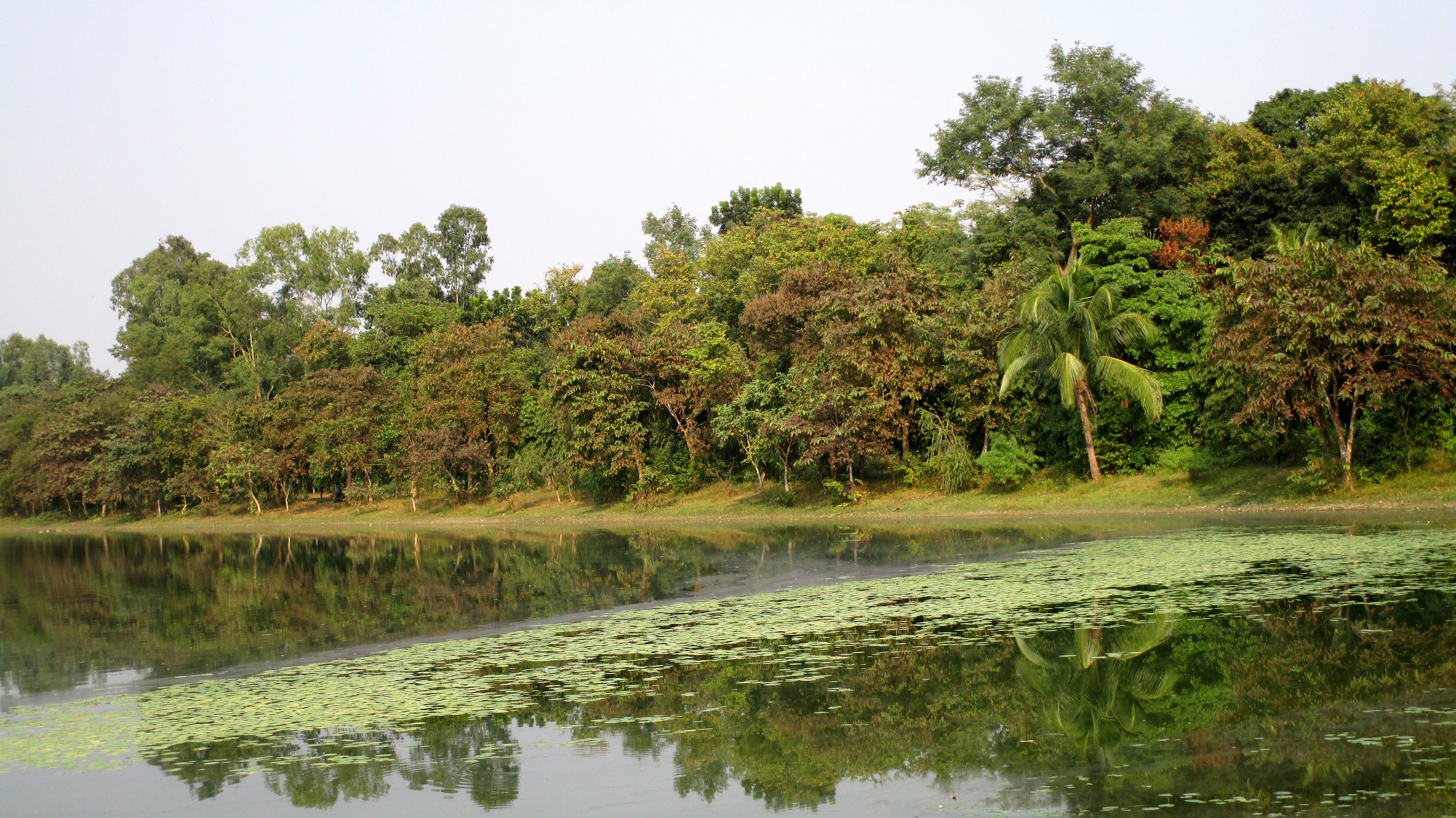

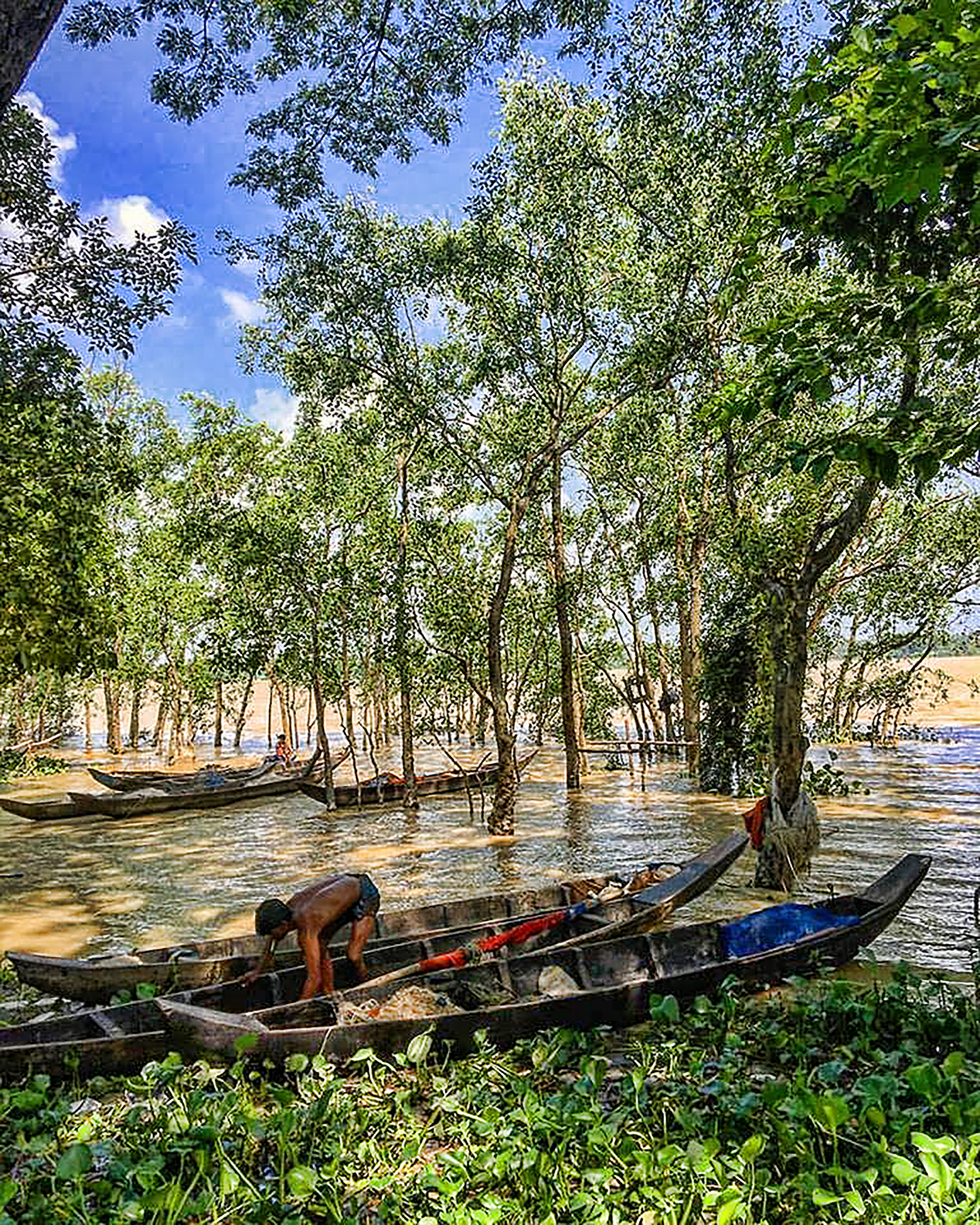
Seasonal flooding

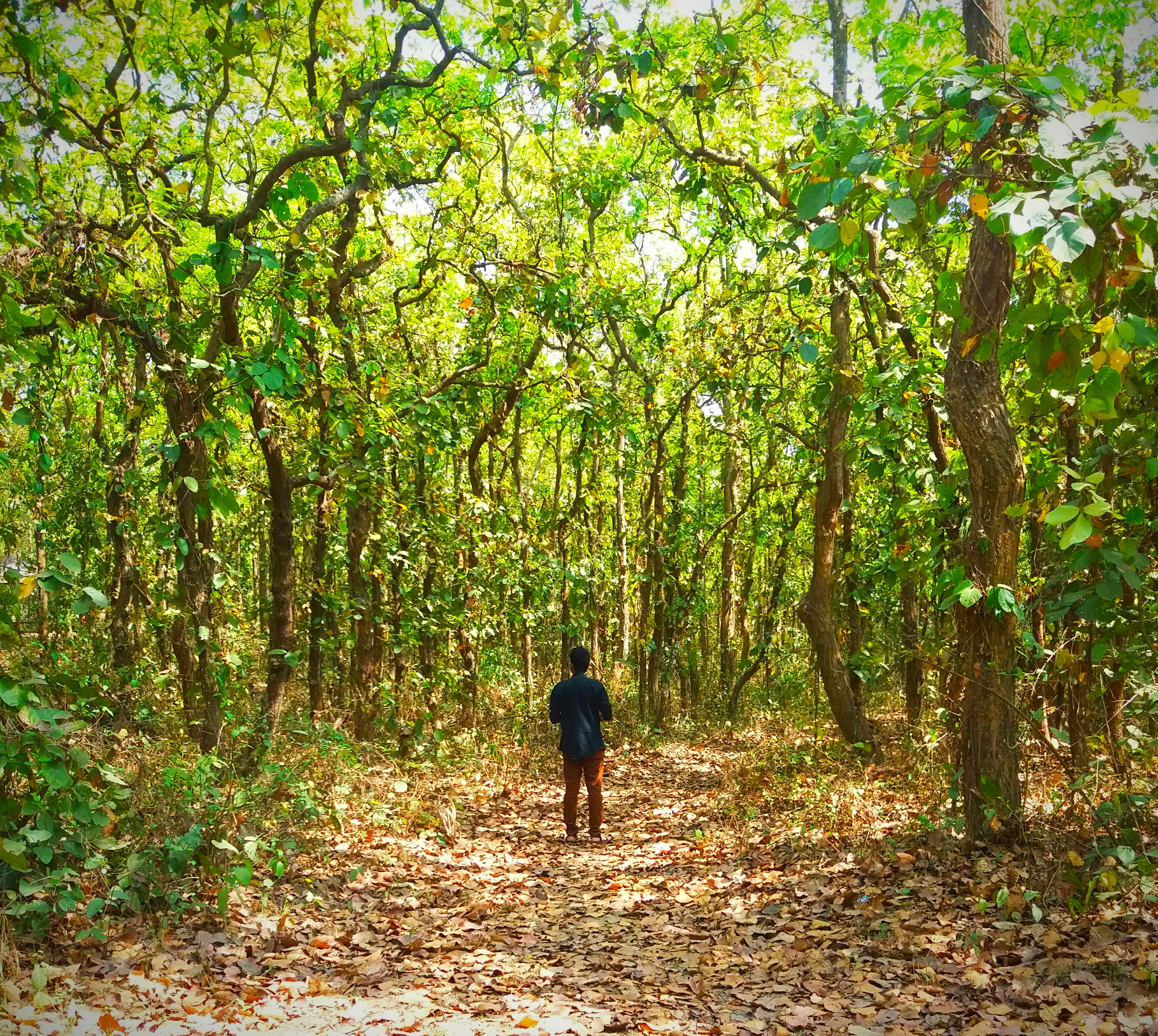
Inside the forests

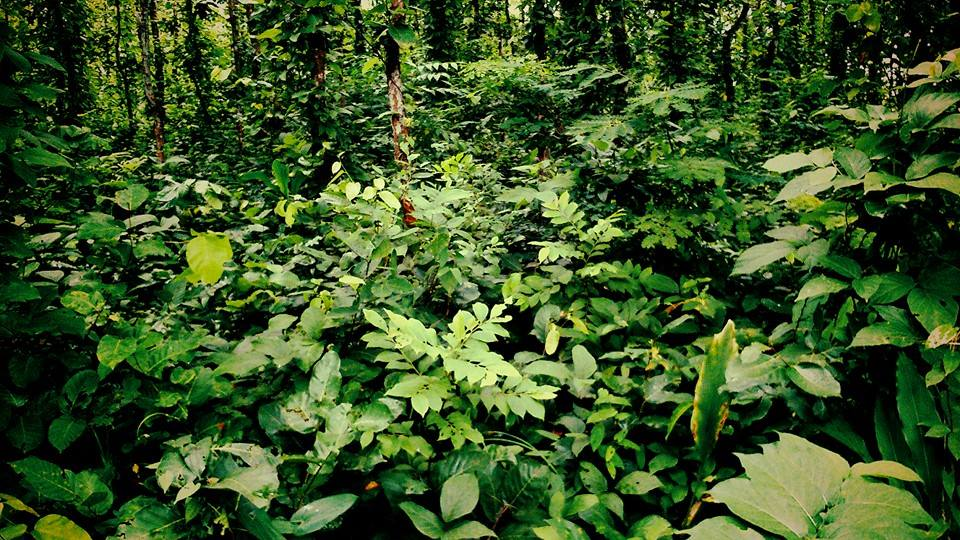

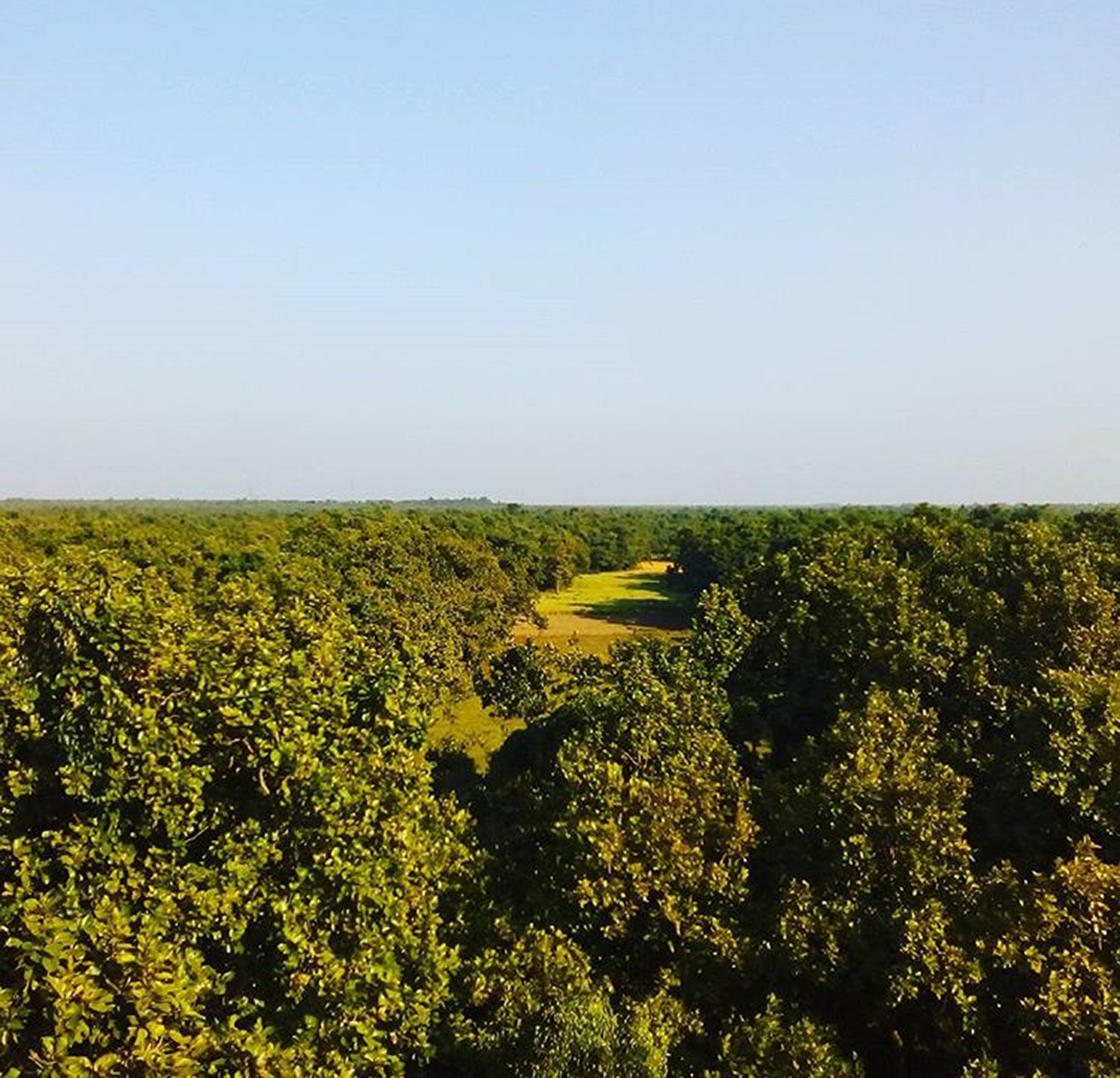
Endless forest in a flat landscape. Nowadays a rare sight.

== Fauna ==
The ecoregion is home to 126 native mammal species. They include threatened species like the tiger (Panthera tigris), Asian elephant (Elephas maximus), gaur (Bos gaurus), sloth bear (Melursus ursinus), chousingha (Tetracerus quadricornis), smooth-coated otter (Lutrogale perspicillata), and great Indian civet (Viverra zibetha).

The ecoregion is home to 380 species of birds species, including the Bengal florican (Houbaropsis bengalensis), lesser florican (Sypheotides indicus), Pallas's fish-eagle (Haliaeetus leucoryphus), swamp francolin (Francolinus gularis), Indian grey hornbill (Ocyceros birostris), and Oriental pied hornbill (Anthracoceros albirostris).

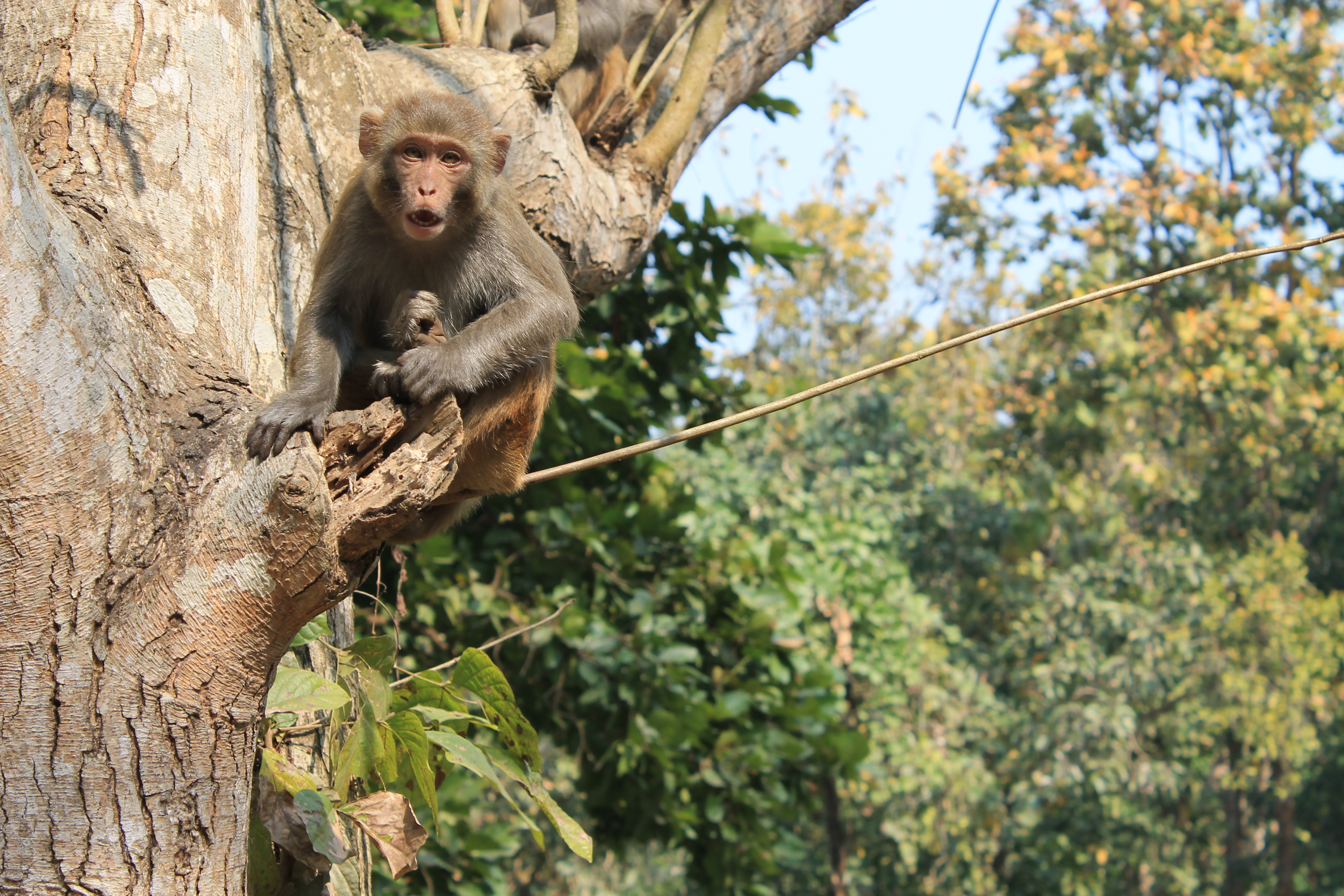
Monkey

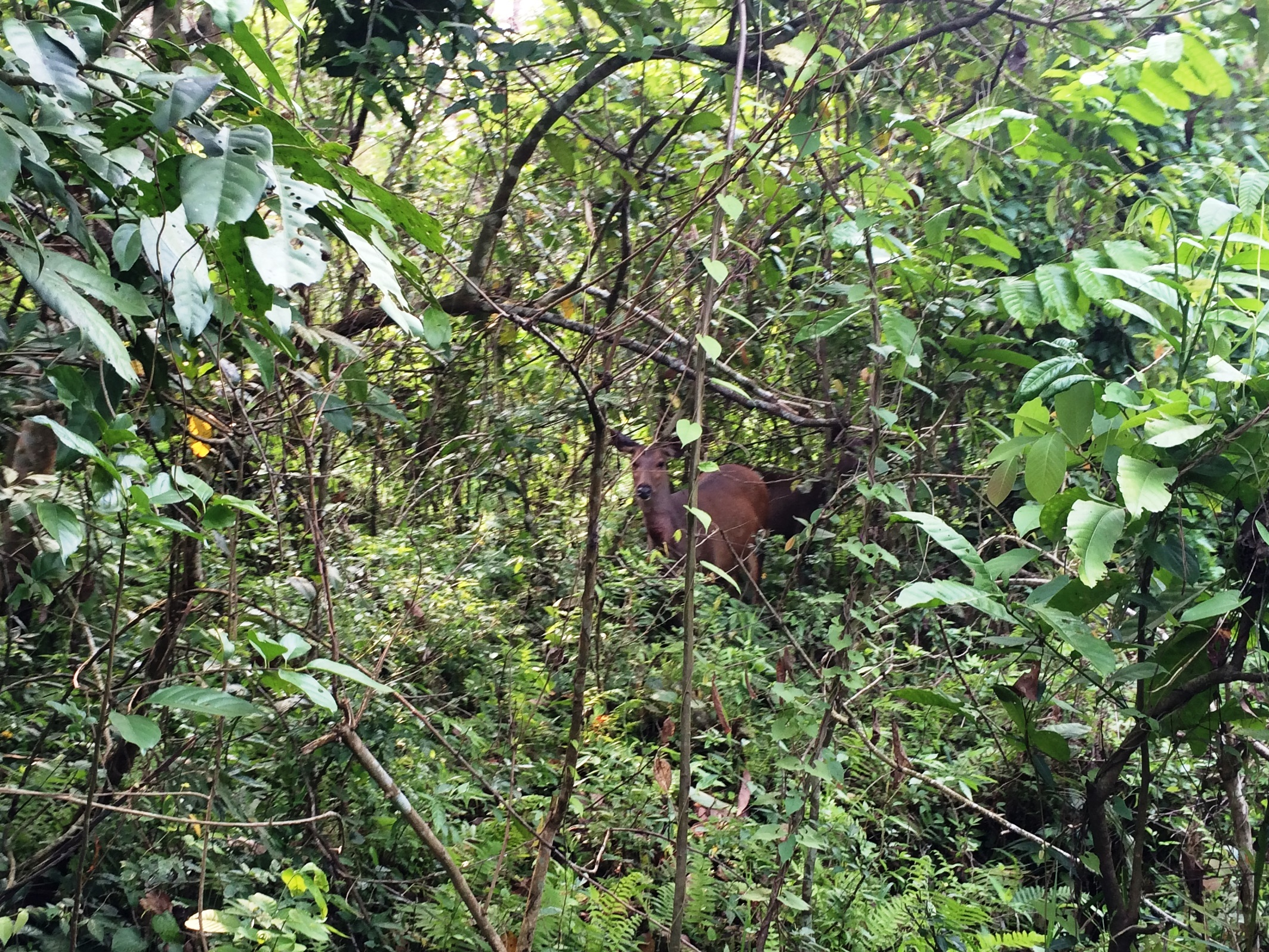
Deer

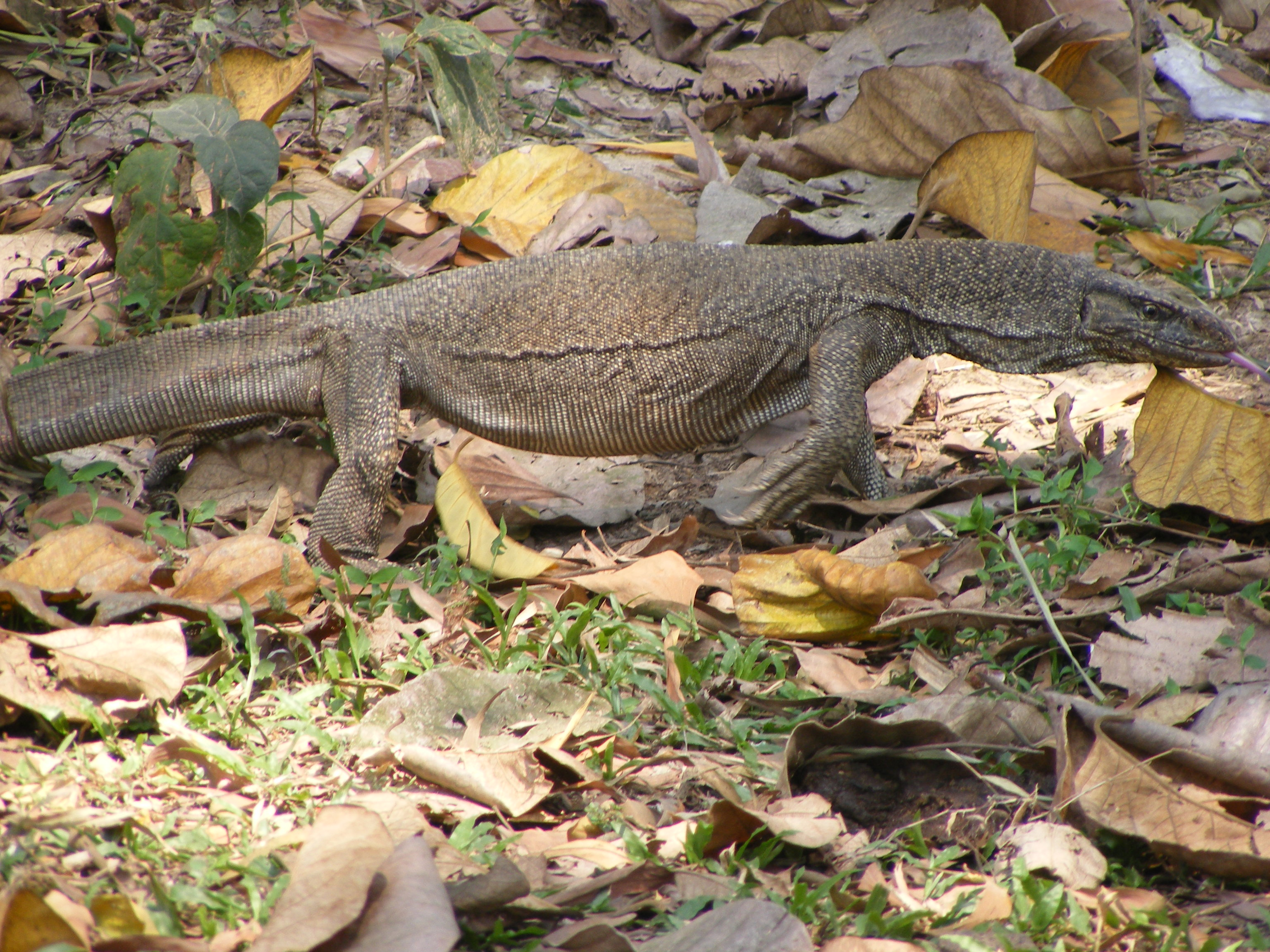
Where the undergrowth is sparse, monitor lizards can roam.

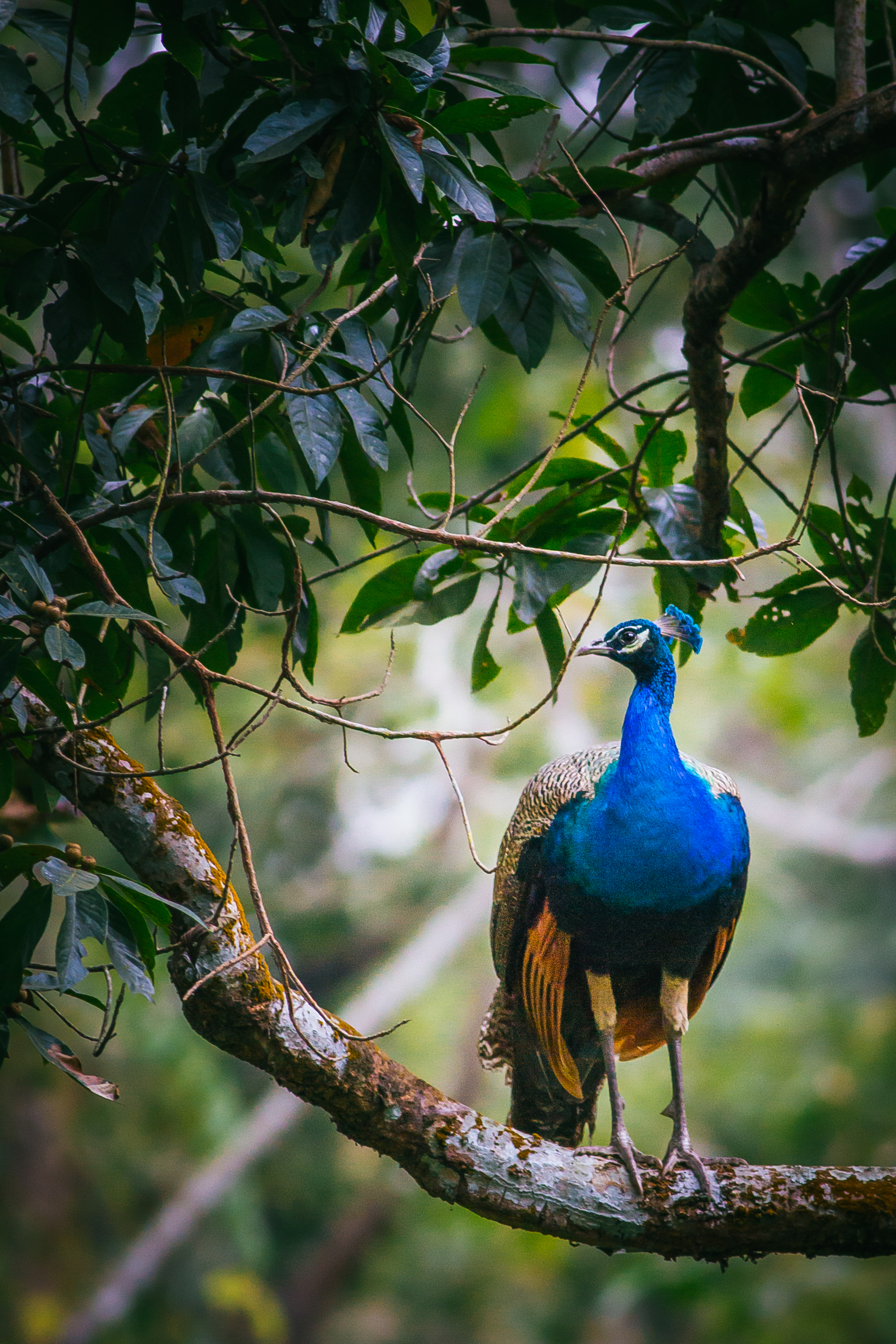
Peacocks

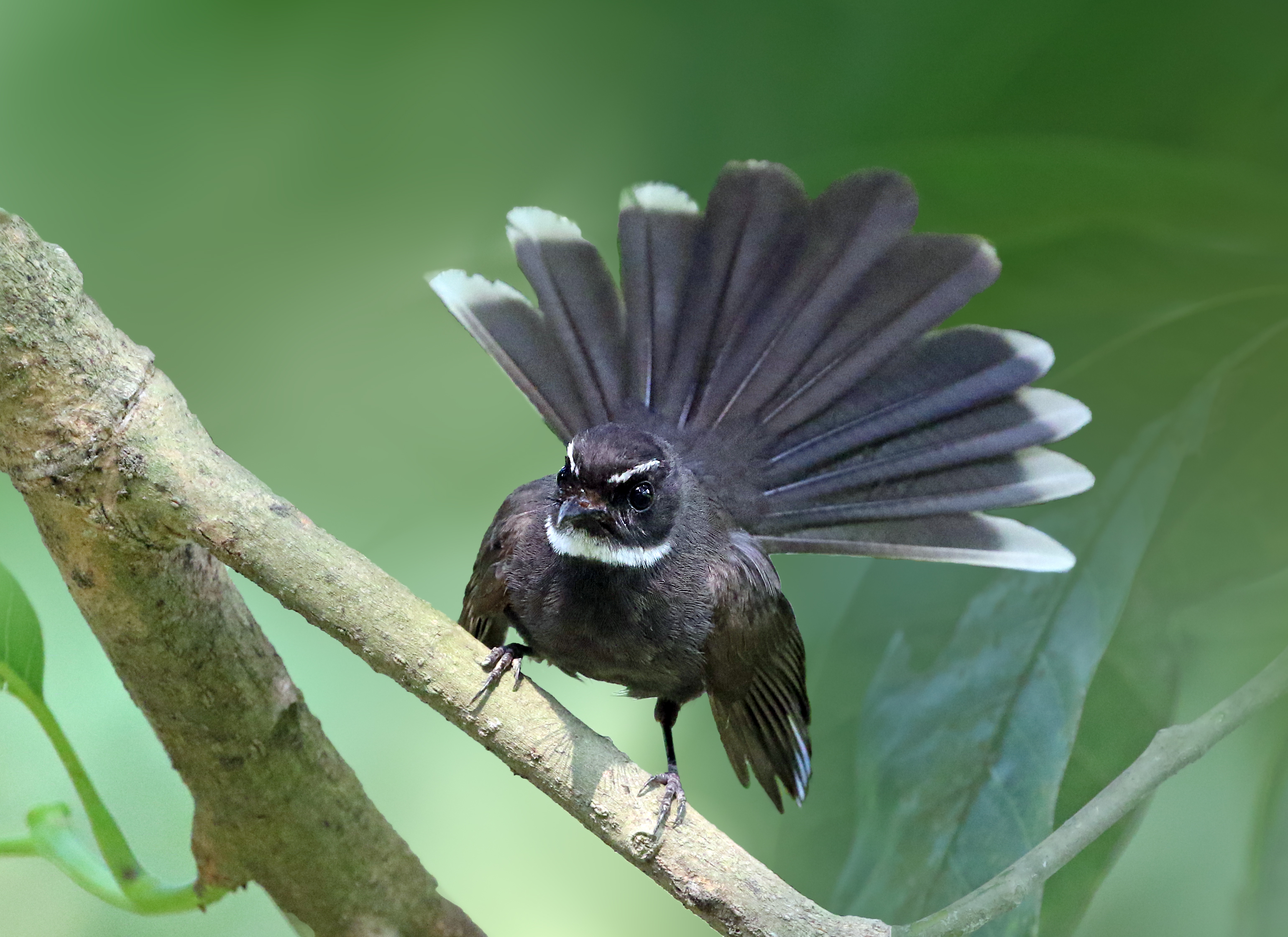
Various bird species (fantail bird)

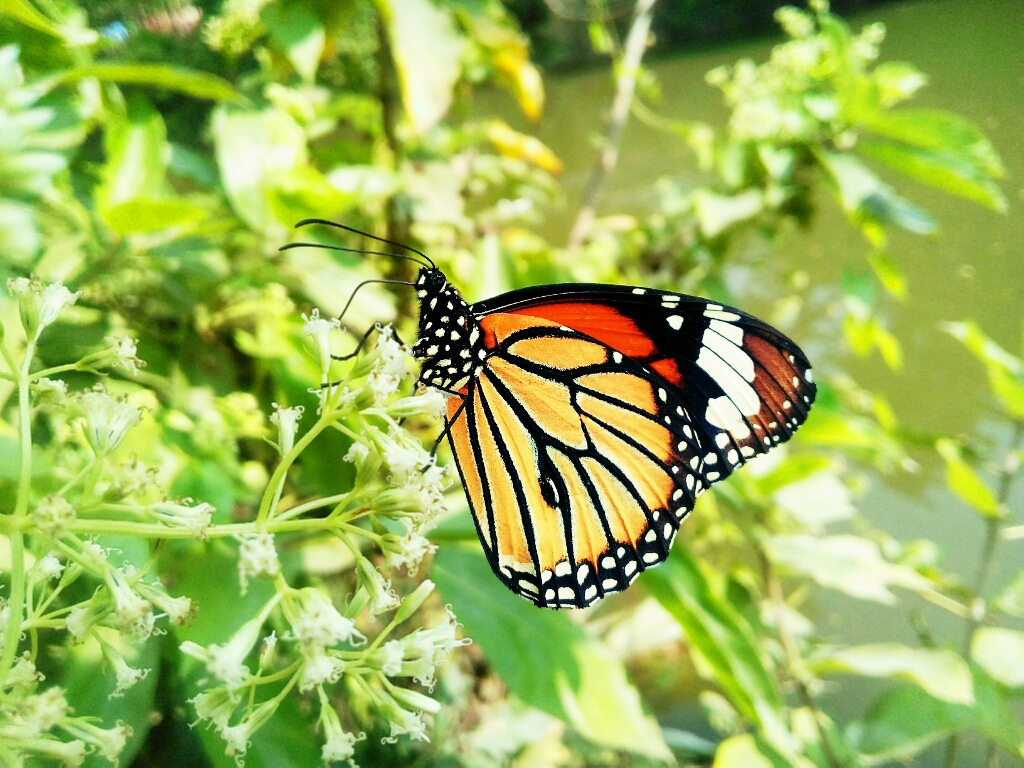
Common tiger butterfliy

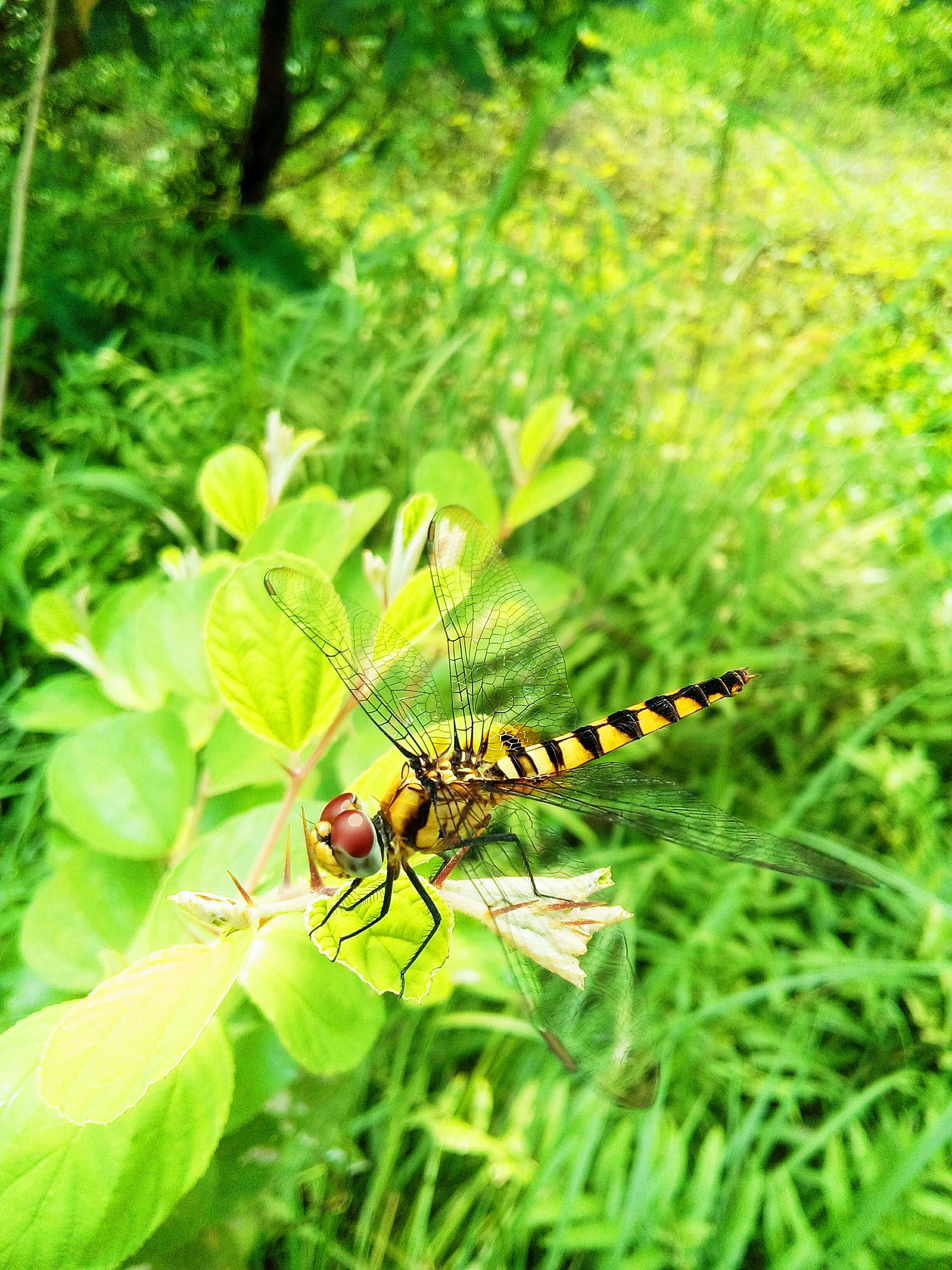
Dragonflies can hunt on the open waters

== Conservation ==
The ecoregion has been densely settled for many centuries, yet much forest remained until the early 20th century. Forest clearance accelerated during the 20th century, and by the end of the century, only 3% of the ecoregion remained in natural forest. Remaining forest areas are mostly small patches, except for one large block of forest south of Varanasi.

In 1997, the World Wildlife Fund identified over 40 protected areas in the ecoregion, with a combined area of about 7010 km², or approximately 3% of the ecoregion's area. Over half of these protected areas were smaller than 100 km²

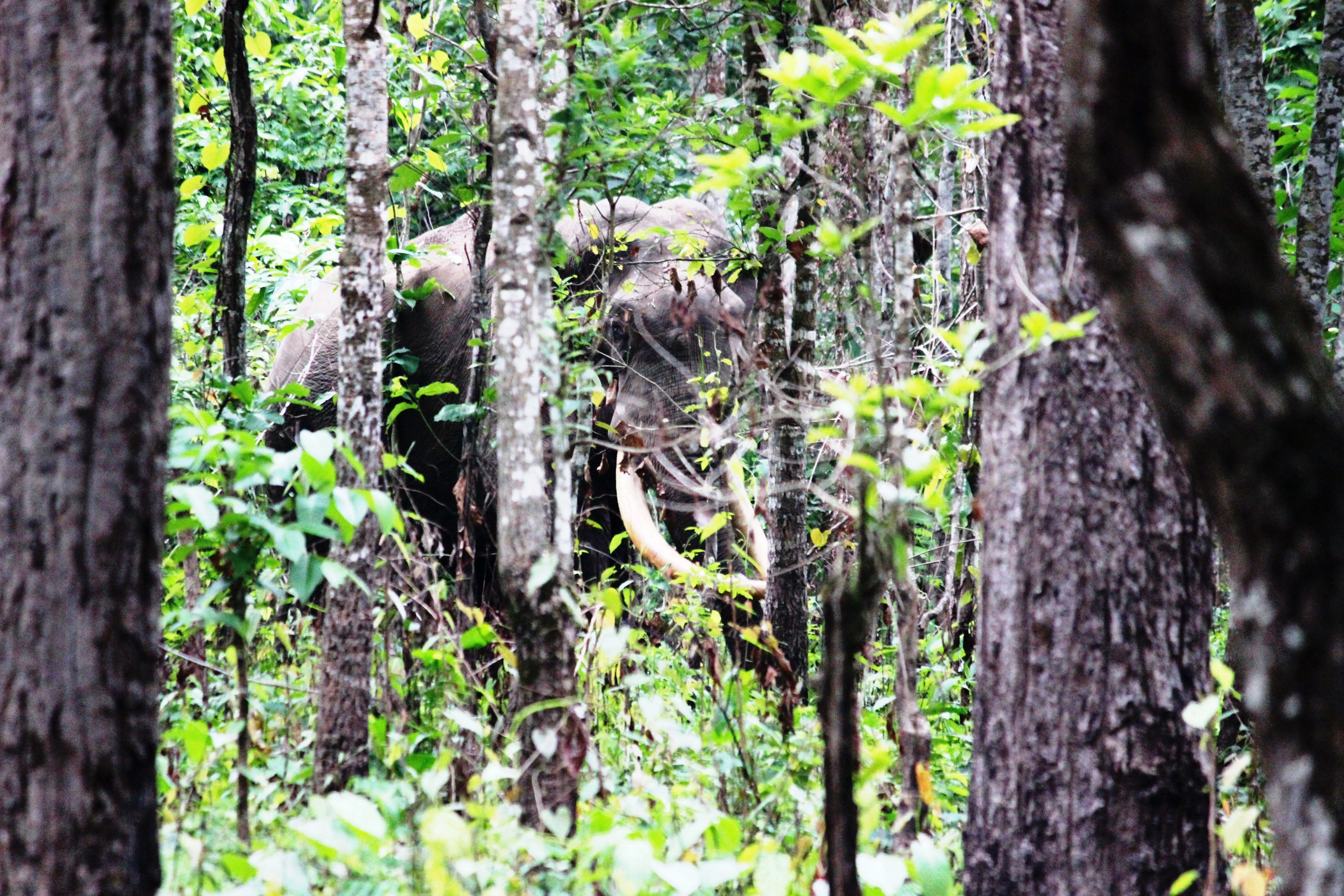
Elephants used to roam these vast forests, but are now confined to a few protected areas.

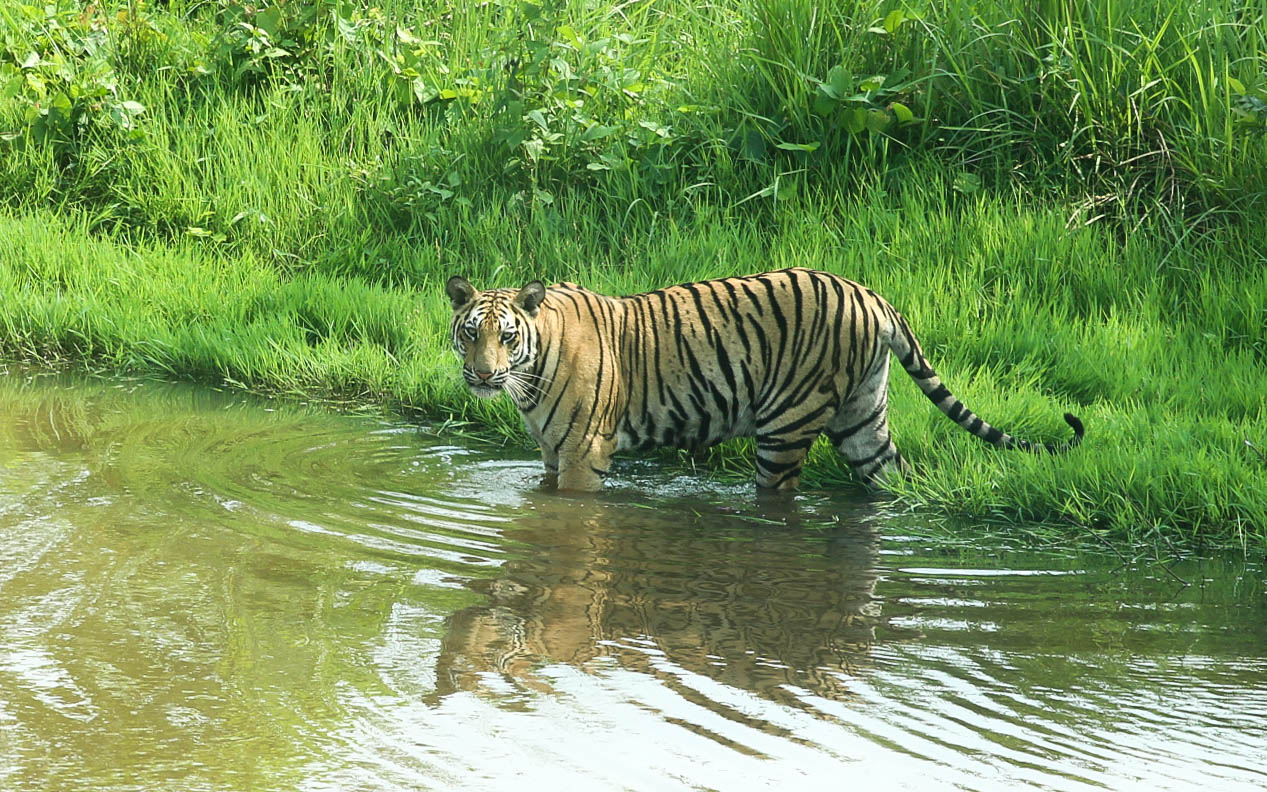
Large numbers of Indian tigers used to roam in this ecoregion. Small populations now survive in a few protected areas.

- Gautam Buddha Wildlife Sanctuary, Bihar (140 km²; also extends into the Chota Nagpur dry deciduous forests)
- Udaipur Wildlife Sanctuary, Bihar (50 km²)
- Kaimur Wildlife Sanctuary, Bihar (2,370 km²)
- Chandra Prabha Wildlife Sanctuary, Uttar Pradesh (80 km²)
- Rajgir Wildlife Sanctuary, Bihar (290 km²)
- Kaimoor Wildlife Sanctuary, Uttar Pradesh (120 km²)
- Valmiki National Park, Bihar (230 km²; also extends into the Himalayan subtropical broadleaf forests)
- Raiganj Wildlife Sanctuary, West Bengal (40 km²)
- Kabartal Bird Sanctuary, Bihar (30 km²)
- Ramsagar National Park, Bangladesh (10 km²)
- Vikramshila Gangetic Dolphin Sanctuary, Bihar 160 km²)
- Nakti Dam Wildlife Sanctuary, Bihar (200 km²)
- Narendrapur Wildlife Sanctuary, West Bengal (90 km²)
- Jaldapara National Park, West Bengal (70 km²)
- Chalan Beel Wildlife Sanctuary, Bangladesh (170 km²)
- Bil Bhatia Wildlife Sanctuary, Bangladesh (30 km²)
- Madhupur National Park, Bangladesh (110 km²)
- Hail Haor Wildlife Sanctuary, Bangladesh (100 km²)
- Roa Wildlife Sanctuary, Tripura (10 km²)
- Bhawal National Park, Bangladesh (90 km²)
- Rema-Kalenga Wildlife Sanctuary, Bangladesh (50 km²)
- Gumti Wildlife Sanctuary, Tripura (420 km²)
- Sepahijala Wildlife Sanctuary, Tripura (20 km²)
- Trishna Wildlife Sanctuary, Tripura (270 km²)
- Aila Beel Wildlife Sanctuary, Bangladesh (30 km²)
- Kawadighi Haor Wildlife Sanctuary, Bangladesh (10 km²)
- Unnamed (20 km²)
- Dakhar Haor Wildlife Sanctuary, Bangladesh (40 km²)
- Dubriar Haor Wildlife Sanctuary, Bangladesh (20 km²)
- Erali Beel Wildlife Sanctuary, Bangladesh (10 km²)
- Hakaluki Haor Wildlife Sanctuary, Bangladesh (160 km²)
- Kawadighi Haor Wildlife Sanctuary, Bangladesh (20 km²)
- Kuri Beel Wildlife Sanctuary, Bangladesh (30 km²)
- Meda Beel Wildlife Sanctuary, Bangladesh (20 km²)
- Rajkandi Wildlife Sanctuary, Bangladesh (50 km²)
- Tangua Haor Wildlife Sanctuary, Bangladesh 160 km²)
- West Bhanugach Wildlife Sanctuary, Bangladesh (50 km²)
- Hazarikhil Wildlife Sanctuary, Bangladesh (30 km²)
- Rampahar-Sitapahar Wildlife Sanctuary, Bangladesh (10 km²)
- Chunati Wildlife Sanctuary, Bangladesh (90 km²)
- Chimbuk Wildlife Sanctuary, Bangladesh (30 km²)
- Himchari National Park, Bangladesh (20 km²)
- Teknaf Wildlife Sanctuary, Bangladesh (100 km²)
- Sangu Matamuhari, Bangladesh (960 km²)
