= List of ecoregions in Nepal =

This is a list of ecoregions in Nepal

== Terrestrial ecoregions ==
Most of Nepal is in the Indomalayan realm. The highest portions of the Himalaya are in the Palearctic realm. Ecoregions are listed by biome.

=== Tropical and subtropical moist broadleaf forests ===
- Himalayan subtropical broadleaf forests
- Lower Gangetic Plains moist deciduous forests
- Upper Gangetic Plains moist deciduous forests

=== Tropical and subtropical coniferous forests ===
- Himalayan subtropical pine forests

=== Temperate broadleaf and mixed forests ===
- Eastern Himalayan broadleaf forests
- Western Himalayan broadleaf forests

=== Temperate coniferous forests ===
- Eastern Himalayan subalpine conifer forests
- Western Himalayan subalpine conifer forests

=== Tropical and subtropical grasslands, savannas, and shrublands ===
- Terai-Duar savanna and grasslands

=== Montane grasslands and shrublands ===
- Eastern Himalayan alpine shrub and meadows (Palearctic)
- Western Himalayan alpine shrub and meadows (Palearctic)

== Freshwater ecoregions ==
- Upper Brahmaputra
- Ganges Himalayan Foothills
- Ganges Delta and Plain
