= Protected areas of Bihar =

Forest and Protected area in Bihar
Description	Area Area (in km^{2})	Percentage
Forest Area	7,299	7.75%
Very DenseForest	332	0.35%
Dense Forest	3,260	3.46 %
Open Forest	3,799	3.94 %
Protected Forest Area	3,208	3.41 %
Protected Non-Forest Area	76.30	

Bihar is a state in East India. It is bounded by Uttar Pradesh to the west, Nepal to the north, West Bengal to the east and Jharkhand to the south. About 7% of the state is protected forest area.

== Geography ==
Bihar has notified forest area of 6,764.14 km², which is 7.1 percent of its geographical area.

The sub-Himalayan foothills of the Someshwar and Dun mountain ranges in West Champaran district are clad in a belt of moist deciduous forest. As well as trees, this consists of scrub, grass and reeds. Here the annual rainfall is above 1,600 mm and this promotes luxuriant sal forests (Shorea robusta) in the favoured areas. Bihar has 3,208 km^{2} (~3.41%) of Protected Forest Area and 76.30 km ^{2} of Protected Non-Forest Area. Bihar is one of the states that has taken "considerable" steps to implement the "Scheduled Tribes and Traditional Forest Dwellers (Recognition of Forest Rights) Act, 2006".

== Protected areas ==
Protected areas in Bihar
Name	Districts of Bihar	Type	Size in km^{2}	Established in
Gautam Budha Wildlife Sanctuary	Gaya	Wildlife Sanctuary	259.48	1971
Bhimbandh Wildlife Sanctuary	Munger	Wildlife Sanctuary	681.99	1976
Pant Wildlife Sanctuary	Rajgir	Wildlife Sanctuary	35.84	1978
Kaimur Wildlife Sanctuary	Kaimur and Rohtas	Wildlife Sanctuary	1504.96	1979
Kanwar Lake Bird Sanctuary	Begusarai	Wildlife Sanctuary	67.5	1987
Nakti Dam Bird Sanctuary	Jamui	Wildlife Sanctuary	3.32	1987
Nagi Dam Bird Sanctuary	Jamui	Wildlife Sanctuary	7.91	1987
Valmiki National Park	West Champaran	National Park	335.65	1989
Vikramshila Gangetic Dolphin Sanctuary	Bhagalpur	Wildlife Sanctuary	50	1990
Barela Jheel Salim Ali Bird Sanctuary	Vaishali	Wildlife Sanctuary	1.96	1997
Sanjay Gandhi Biological Park	Patna	Zoo and Botanic Garden	0.619	1969
Udaypur Wildlife Sanctuary	Champaran	Wildlife Sanctuary	8.74	1978
Valmiki Wildlife Sanctuary	West Champaran	Wildlife Sanctuary	880.78	1976

== See also ==
- Flora of Bihar
- Fauna of Bihar
- Protected areas of India
- List of Zoos in India
