= Fauna of Bihar =

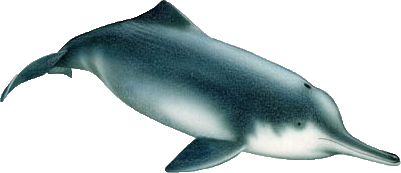
Gangetic dolphins are known as susu locally

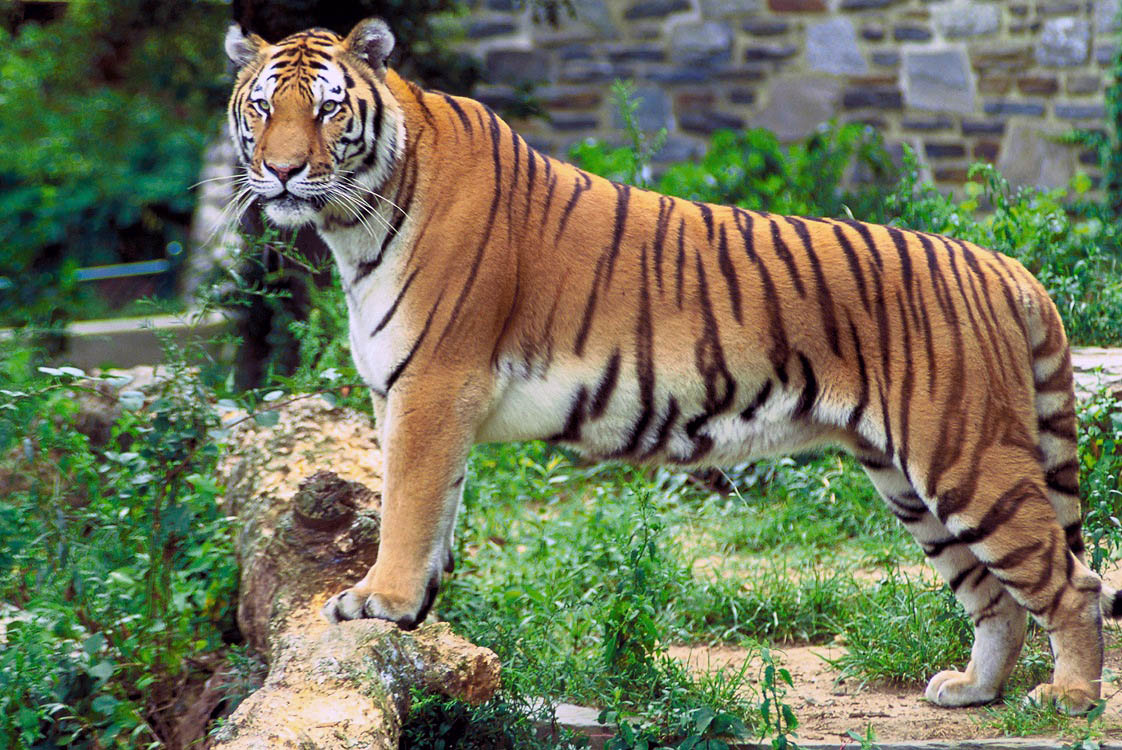
A tiger in the tiger reserve of Valmiki National Park

The state of Bihar has a total of 21 Wildlife Sanctuaries and 1 National Park (Valmiki National Park, West Champaran).

The Ganges river dolphin, or "susu", is found in the Ganges and Brahmaputra, south Asia's largest river systems. It is among the most endangered mammals of the region.

The Ganges river dolphin ranges from 2.3 to 2.6 meters in length. The tail fluke is on average 46 cm in width. Females are larger than males. The color of this dolphin varies from lead-colored to black. The undersides are lighter in color. The rostrum is 18 to 21 cm in length and the forehead is steep and rises abruptly from the base of the snout. The dorsal fin is rudimentary and ridge-like, and the ends of the pectoral fins are squared instead of tapered. The neck is visibly constricted and the blowhole is a longitudinal slit. There are 28 to 29 teeth on either side of the jaw. The eye and optic nerve of the Ganges river dolphin are degenerate. The eye lacks a lens and is therefore incapable of forming images on the retina. However, it functions in light-detection. It is believed that the lack of a true visual apparatus in the river dolphin is related to its habitat; the water in which it lives is so muddied that vision in essentially useless.

Valmiki National Park, West Champaran district, covering about 800 km^{2} of forest, is the 18th tiger reserve of India, and is ranked fourth in terms of density of tiger population. The tiger population there is genetically distinct. It has diverse landscapes, sheltering rich wildlife habitats and floral and faunal composition, with the prime protected carnivores.

== See also ==
- Flora of Bihar
- Protected areas of Bihar
- Patna Zoo
- Flora of India
- Fauna of India
