= Terai–Duar savanna and grasslands =

Lowland ecoregion at the base of the Himalayas

Terai-Duar savanna and grasslands
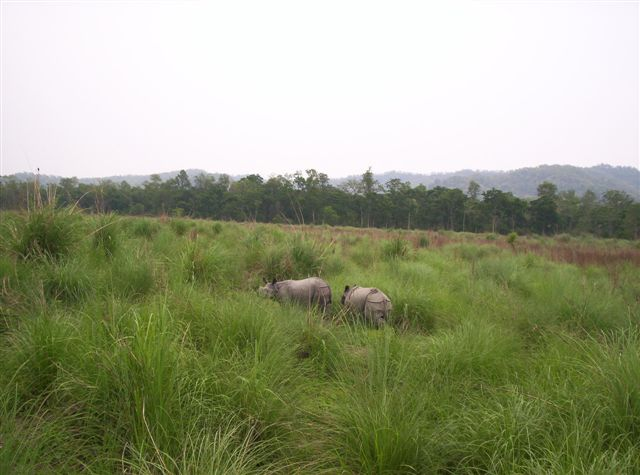
- Indian rhinoceros in Chitwan National Park, Nepal

Ecology
- Realm: Indomalayan
- Biome: tropical and subtropical grasslands, savannas, and shrublands
- Borders: List: Himalayan subtropical pine forests; Himalayan subtropical broadleaf forests; Eastern Himalayan broadleaf forests; Lower Gangetic Plains moist deciduous forests; Upper Gangetic Plains moist deciduous forests
- Bird species: 366
- Mammal species: 115

Geography
- Area: 34,600 km^{2} (13,400 sq mi)
- Countries: India; Nepal; Bhutan
- Coordinates: 27.50°N 84.33°E

Conservation
- Habitat loss: 90.62%
- Protected: 8.91%

The Terai–Duar savanna and grasslands is a narrow lowland ecoregion at the base of the Himalayas, about 25 km (16 mi) wide, and a continuation of the Indo-Gangetic Plain in India, Nepal and Bhutan. It is colloquially called Terai in the Ganges Basin east to Nepal, then Dooars in West Bengal, Bhutan and Assam east to the Brahmaputra River. It harbours the world's tallest grasslands, which are the most threatened and rare worldwide.

== Location and description ==
This tropical and subtropical grasslands, savannas, and shrublands biome stretches from western Bhutan to southern Nepal's Terai, westward to Banke, covering the Dang and Deukhuri Valleys along the Rapti River to India's Bhabar and Doon Valley. Each end crosses the border into India's states of Uttarakhand, Uttar Pradesh and Bihar. The eastern and central areas are wetter than the western end.

In Nepal, the wetlands of Koshi Tappu Wildlife Reserve, Beeshazar Tal in the bufferzone of Chitwan National Park, Jagdishpur Reservoir and Ghodaghodi Tal are designated Ramsar sites. Shuklaphanta National Park is Nepal's largest patch of continuous grassland.

== Flora ==
The Terai–Duar savanna and grasslands are a mosaic of tall riverside grasslands, savannas and evergreen and deciduous forests, depending on soil quality and the amount of rain each area receives. The grasslands of the Terai in Nepal are among the tallest in the world, and are maintained by silt deposited by the yearly monsoon floods. Important grasses include baruwa (Tripidium bengalense) and kans grass (Saccharum spontaneum), which quickly establishes itself after the retreat of the monsoon waters. In the hillier areas the dominant tree is sal (Shorea robusta), which can grow to a height of 45 m (148 ft). The belt also contains riverside tropical deciduous forest comprising Mallotus philippensis, jamun, cotton tree, Mallotus nudiflorus, and Garuga pinnata.

== Fauna ==
The ecoregion is habitat for a huge number of mammalian and bird species. Notable are the large numbers of the endangered greater one-horned rhinoceros and Bengal tigers as well as Asian elephants, sloth bears, Indian leopards.

In Nepal's Chitwan National Park, more than 400 rhinos were sighted in 2008, and 125 adult tigers were recorded during a survey conducted from December 2009 to March 2010, which covered an area of 1,261 km^{2} (487 sq mi). Nepal's Bardia National Park and Shuklaphanta National Park, and India's Valmiki and Dudhwa National Parks are home to nearly 100 tigers. Chitwan along with the adjoining Parsa National Park is of major importance, especially for tigers and clouded leopard. Grazing animals of the grasslands include five species of deer, barasingha, sambar, chital, hog deer and muntjac along with four large grazing animals, Asian elephant, rhinoceros, gaur and nilgai. Endangered mammals found here include the wild water buffalo and the near-endemic hispid hare (Caprolagus hispidus).

The grasslands are also home to a number of reptiles including the gharial, mugger crocodile and soft-shelled turtles.

The grasslands partly cover two BirdLife International Endemic Bird Areas, the Central Himalayas EBA in western Nepal and the western end of the Assam Plains EBA south of Bhutan. There are three near-endemic bird species. The 44 threatened and declining bird species of the grasslands include the Bengal florican (Houbaropsis bengalensis), lesser florican (Sypheotides indica), sarus crane (Grus antigone) and the elusive Indian grassbird.

== Threats and conservation ==
Areas with tall grasslands are of special conservation importance. Woody plant encroachment is a threat to the Terai–Duar savanna and grasslands.

== See also ==
- List of ecoregions in India
- List of ecoregions in Nepal
- Himalayan subtropical broadleaf forests
- Margalla Hills
