= Himalayan subtropical broadleaf forests =

Ecoregion in Nepal, India, and Bhutan

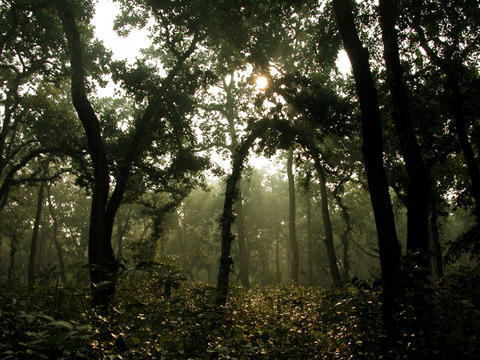
- Sal forest in Chitwan National Park

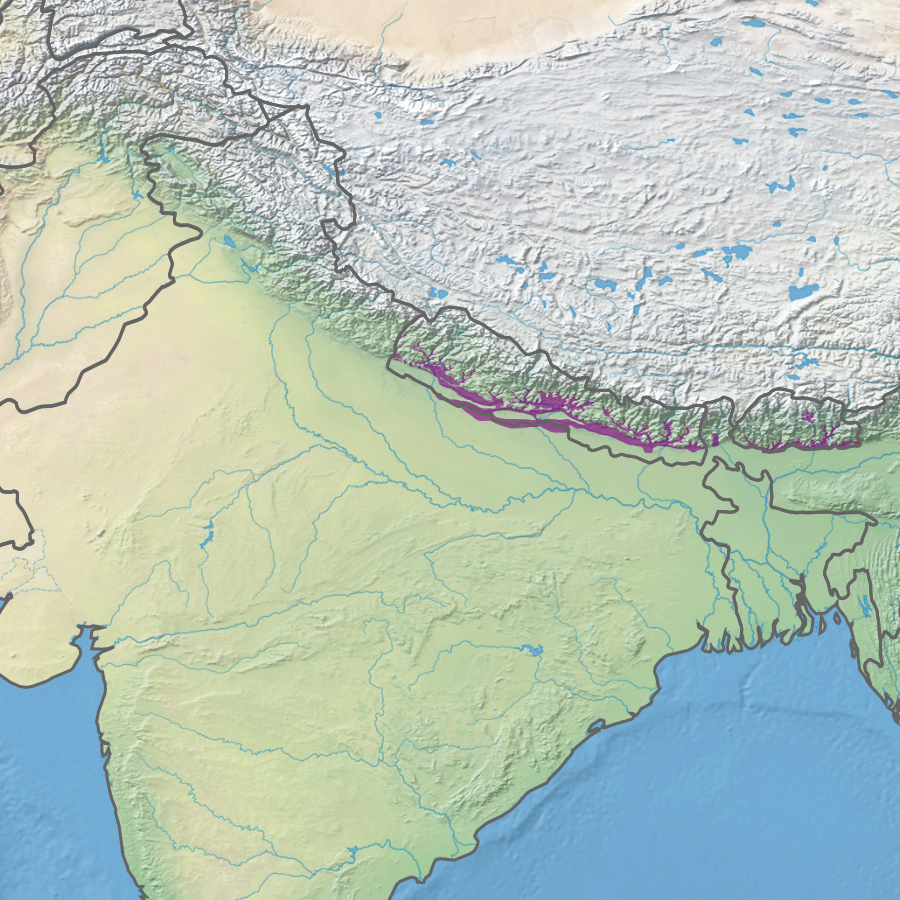
- Ecoregion territory (in purple)

Ecology
- Realm: Indomalayan
- Biome: tropical and subtropical moist broadleaf forests
- Borders: List: Himalayan subtropical pine forests; Western Himalayan broadleaf forests; Eastern Himalayan broadleaf forests; Brahmaputra Valley semi-evergreen forests; Terai-Duar savanna and grasslands
- Bird species: 343
- Mammal species: 148

Geography
- Area: 38,200 km^{2} (14,700 sq mi)
- Countries: Bhutan; India; Nepal

Conservation
- Habitat loss: 81.553%
- Protected: 6.77%

The Himalayan subtropical broadleaf forests is an ecoregion which extends along the southern foothills of the Himalayas through Nepal, India, Bhutan. It stretches from central Nepal, Bihar along the Nepalese border, eastern Nepal, Darjeeling District of India's West Bengal state, and Bhutan.

== Geography ==
The ecoregion covers an area of 38,200 km^{2} (14,700 sq mi). The soil is alluvium.

Above 1,000 m (3,300 ft), the broadleaf forests transition to the Himalayan subtropical pine forests. At lower elevations the ecoregion is flanked by the Terai-Duar savannas and grasslands and the tropical monsoon forests of the Gangetic Plain.

== Flora ==
The ecoregion hosts a broad range of plant communities, based on its complex topography, differing soils, and variations in rainfall from the drier west to the more humid east. Its location on the south slope of the Himalaya allows the intermingling of plants and animals from the Indomalayan and Palearctic biogeographic realms. Predominant tree species include sal (Shorea robusta) and species of Terminalia, Bauhinia, Schima, and Castanopsis, which are typical of Asian moist subtropical and tropical forests. Trees grow to 30 meters in height and up to 50 meters in favorable conditions. Climbers and epiphytes are common in the humid forests. The main forest types include Dodonaea scrub, subtropical dry evergreen forests of Olea europaea subsp. cuspidata, northern dry mixed deciduous forests, dry Siwalik sal (Shorea robusta) forests, moist mixed deciduous forests, subtropical broadleaf wet hill forests, northern tropical semi-evergreen forests, and northern tropical wet evergreen forests.

== Fauna ==
Several mammals native to the ecoregion are threatened, including the Bengal tiger, Indian elephant, smooth-coated otter, clouded leopard, gaur, Sumatran serow, Irrawaddy squirrel, and particoloured flying squirrel. The chestnut-breasted partridge is endemic.

== Protected areas ==
Eight protected areas extend into this ecoregion covering 2,710 km^{2} (1,050 sq mi), which is about 7% of the ecoregion's area:

- in India: Sohagi Barwa Sanctuary and Valmiki National Park;
- in Nepal: Bardia National Park, Chitwan National Park, Parsa National Park;
- in Bhutan: Royal Manas National Park, Khaling Wildlife Sanctuary and Phibsoo Wildlife Sanctuary.

Two high-priority tiger conservation units (TCU) extend across adjacent ecoregions:

- Chitwan-Parsa-Valmiki TCU covers a 3,549 km^{2} (1,370 sq mi) huge block of alluvial grasslands and subtropical moist deciduous forests;
- Bardia-Banke TCU covers 1,518 km^{2} (586 sq mi).
