= Parsa National Park =

National park in Nepal

- Nepali: पर्सा राष्ट्रिय निकुञ्ज
- IUCN category II (national park)
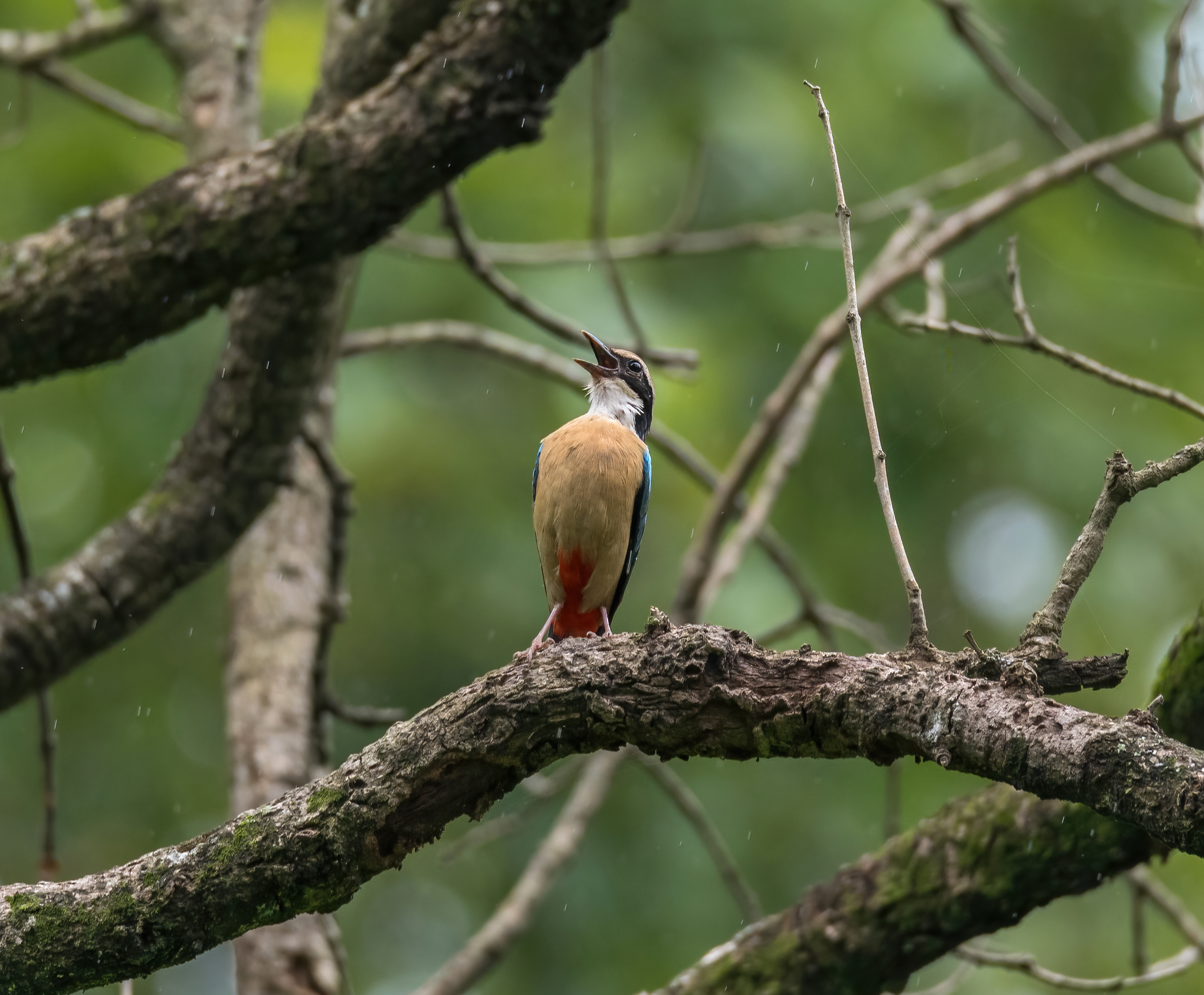
- Indian pitta at Parsa National Park

- Location within Madhesh Province Location within Bagmati Province Location within Nepal Location within South Asia
- Interactive map of Parsa National Park
- Location: Nepal
- Nearest city: Birgunj
- Coordinates: 27°19′08″N 84°54′45″E
- Area: 627.39 km^{2} (242.24 sq mi)
- Established: 1984 as Wildlife Reserve, 2017 as National Park
- Governing body: Department of National Parks and Wildlife Conservation

Parsa National Park is a national park in the Terai of south-central Nepal covering an area of 627.39 km^{2} (242.24 sq mi) in the Parsa, Makwanpur and Bara Districts and ranging in elevation from 435 to 950 m (1,427 to 3,117 ft) in the Sivalik Hills. It was established as a wildlife reserve in 1984 and received national park status in 2017. It is surrounded by a buffer zone since 2005 with an area of 285.3 km^{2} (110.2 sq mi). In 2015, the protected area was further extended by 49 sq mi (128 km^{2}).

To the north of Parsa National Park, the East Rapti River and Sivalik Hills form a natural boundary to human settlements. To the east, the boundary extends up to the Hetauda–Birgunj highway; to the south, a forest road demarcates the park's boundary. To the west is Chitwan National Park, which is situated just north of Valmiki National Park, a tiger reserve in India. Thus, this transnational protected area of 2,075 km^{2} (801 sq mi) represents the Tiger Conservation Unit (TCU) Chitwan–Parsa–Valmiki, which covers a total of 3,549 km^{2} (1,370 sq mi) in the Terai–Duar savanna and grasslands.

Before being converted to a protected area, the region was a private game reserve and hunting park for both the British and Nepalese elite.

== Vegetation ==
The typical vegetation in the park consists of sal forest constituting about 90% of the area. Chir pine grows in the Churia Hills; Khair, sissoo and silk cotton trees occur along watercourses. Sabai grass grows well on the southern face of the Churia Hills. An estimated 919 floral species have been recorded including 298 vascular plants, 234 dicots, 58 monocots, five pteridophytes, and one gymnosperm.

== Fauna ==
A census conducted in May 2008 confirmed the presence of 37 gaurs. Four adult Bengal tigers were estimated to be resident in the Parsa National Park in 2008. A three-month camera trapping survey in February 2017 revealed the presence of 19 Bengal tigers, indicating a substantial increase of the population. As of 2015, three Indian rhinoceros have been recorded in the national park.

Reptiles present include the mugger crocodile, king cobra, monocled cobra, Russell's viperr, elongated tortoise, Indian softshell turtle, Indian black turtle, Indian flapshell turtle, Oriental garden lizard and Oriental rat snake.
