= Flora of Bihar =

Aspect of the Indian state

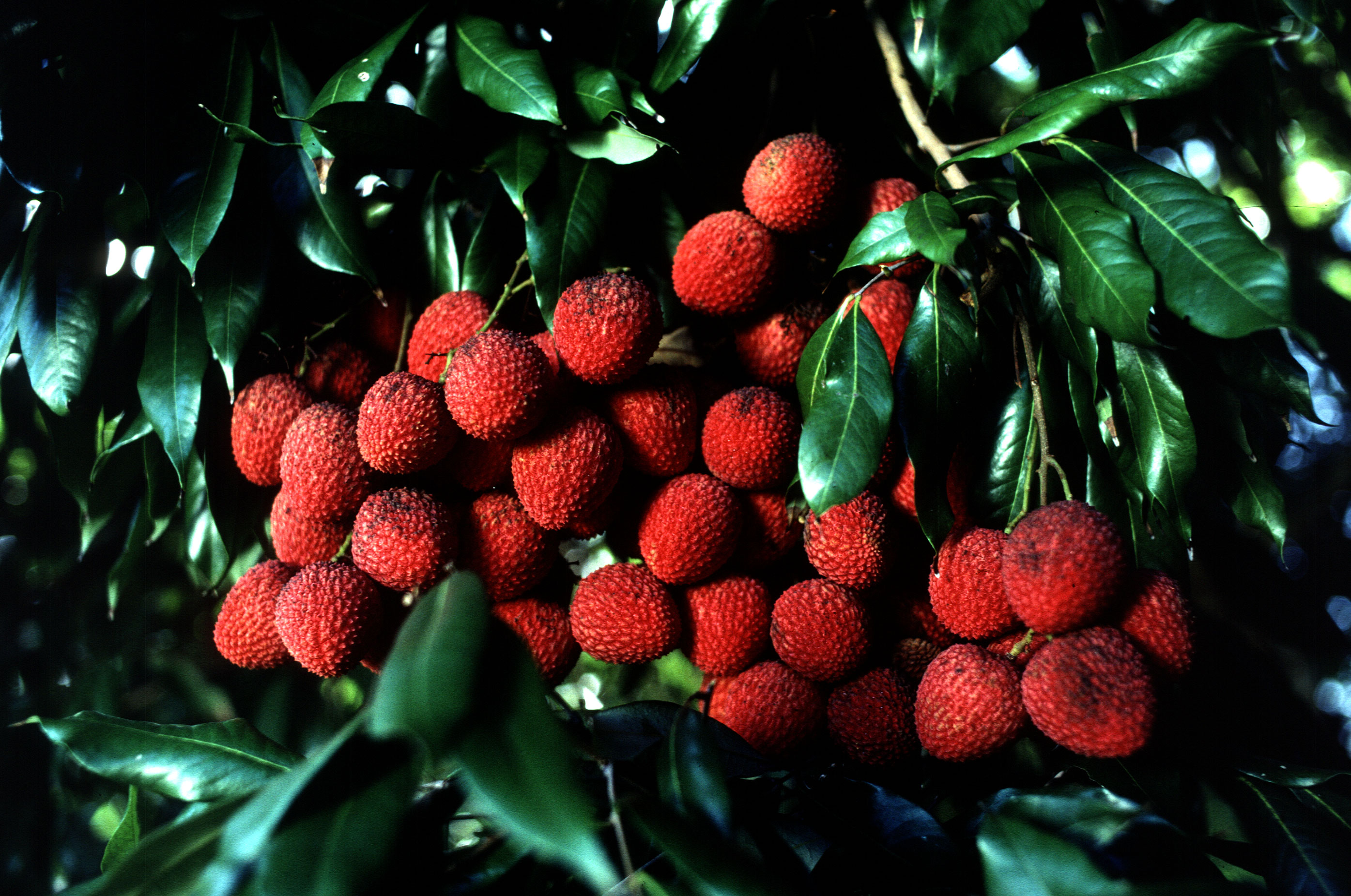
Lychee

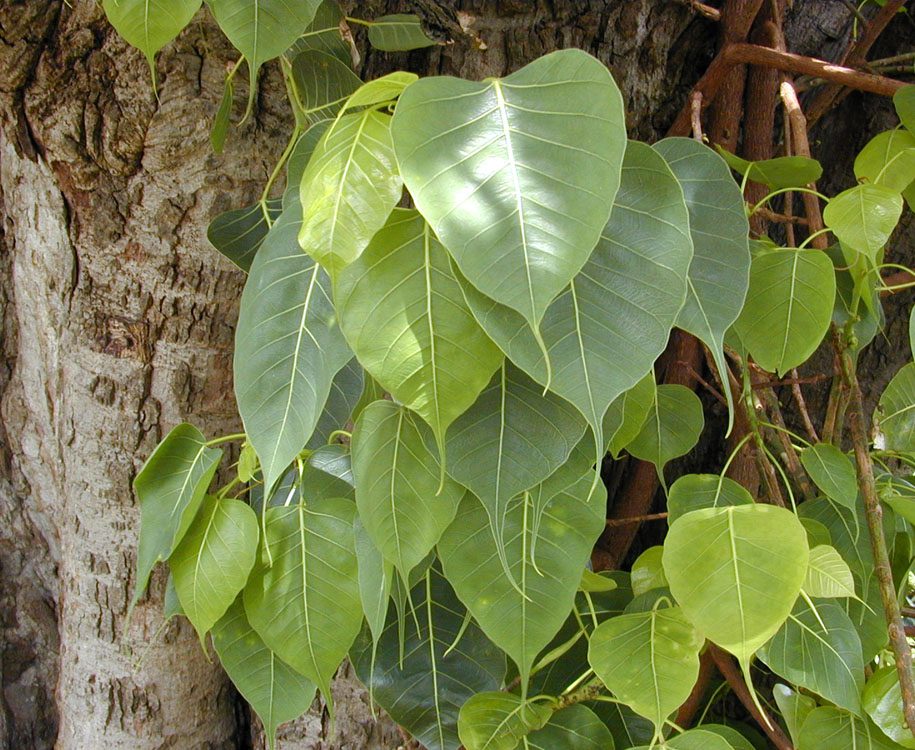
Peepal tree (Ficus religiosa)

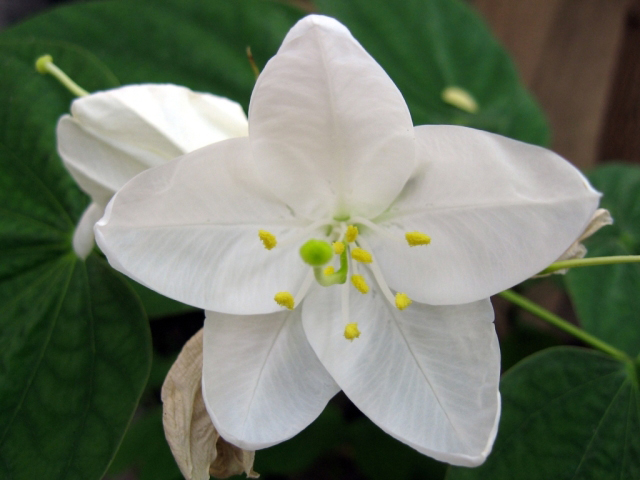
Bauhinia acuminata, locally known as kachnaar

The Indian state of Bihar contains sub-Himalayan foothills and mountains with moist deciduous forests. Rainfall may exceed 1600 millimeters per year. Common trees include Shorea robusta (sal), Toona ciliata, Diospyros melanoxylon (kendu), Boswellia serrata (salai), Terminalia tomentosa (asan), Terminalia bellirica (bahera), Terminalia arjuna (arjun), Pterocarpus marsupium (paisar), Madhuca indica (mahua).

Plants of Bihar include:

- Holarrhena antidysenterica
- Flemingia chappar
- Ziziphus xylopyrus
- Bauhinia vahlii
- Smilex protifrera
- Butea superba
- Butea parviflora

== See also ==
- Fauna of Bihar
- Flora of India
- Fauna of India
- Protected areas of Bihar
