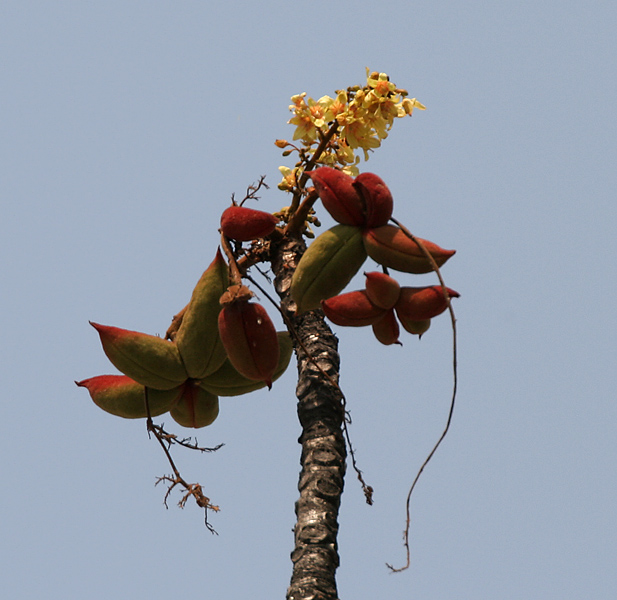

Scientific classification
- Kingdom: Plantae
- Clade: Tracheophytes
- Clade: Angiosperms
- Clade: Eudicots
- Clade: Rosids
- Order: Malvales
- Family: Malvaceae
- Genus: Sterculia
- Species: S. villosa

Binomial name
- Sterculia villosa Roxb. ex Sm.

= Sterculia villosa =

Species of tree

Sterculia villosa, the hairy sterculia, or elephant rope tree, known vernacularly as Sardol, Udal, or Udar in Northeast India, is a medium-sized, monoecious tree. A leaf from this plant is characterized by a petiole about 25–40 cm long and by a lamina composed of 5-7-lobes, approximately 20–40 cm long and wide. The leaves are glabrescent on the top but tomentose on the bottom. The elephant rope tree's panicles are about 15–30 cm long, rusty in color and pendulous. Its flowers are unisexual and have pedicels about 4–8 mm long and thread-like bracteoles; the flowers are easily detached and tend to be shed at an early stage. Its seeds are oblong, smooth, and black. It is distributed throughout India and Bangladesh, although it is cultivated elsewhere due to its fast-spreading nature.

Sterculia villosa possesses certain paper-making characteristics. In Northeast India and Bangladesh, the plant's pulp is generally used for making tea boxes and light-weight packing cases, apart from use as fire-wood in certain rural areas.
