= Gautam Budha Wildlife Sanctuary =

Wildlife sanctuary in India

- IUCN category IV (habitat/species management area)
- Location within Jharkhand Location within Bihar Location within India
- Interactive map of Gautam Budha Wildlife Sanctuary
- Location: Gaya district, Bihar; Koderma district, Jharkhand
- Coordinates: 24.54°N 85.56°E
- Area: 259 km^{2} (100 sq mi)
- Established: 1976

Gautam Budha Wildlife Sanctuary (also spelled Gautam Buddha) is a wildlife sanctuary located in Gaya district of Bihar state and Koderma district of Jharkhand state in east-central India.

The refuge was established in 1976, and covers an area of 259 km^{2}. Prior to becoming a wildlife refuge, the area was a private hunting reserve.

The refuge covers portions of the Lower Gangetic Plains moist deciduous forests and Chota Nagpur dry deciduous forests ecoregions. Plant communities include dry and moist sal (Shorea robusta) forests, ravine thorn forest, and tropical dry riverine forest.

Fauna include tigers, leopards, wolves, sloth bears, chitals, chinkaras, and many species of birds.

The sanctuary has a rest house. The refuge is 65 km southeast of Gaya, which has a railway station and airport.
