= Nakti Dam Wildlife Sanctuary =

Protected area in Bihar, India

- IUCN category IV (habitat/species management area)
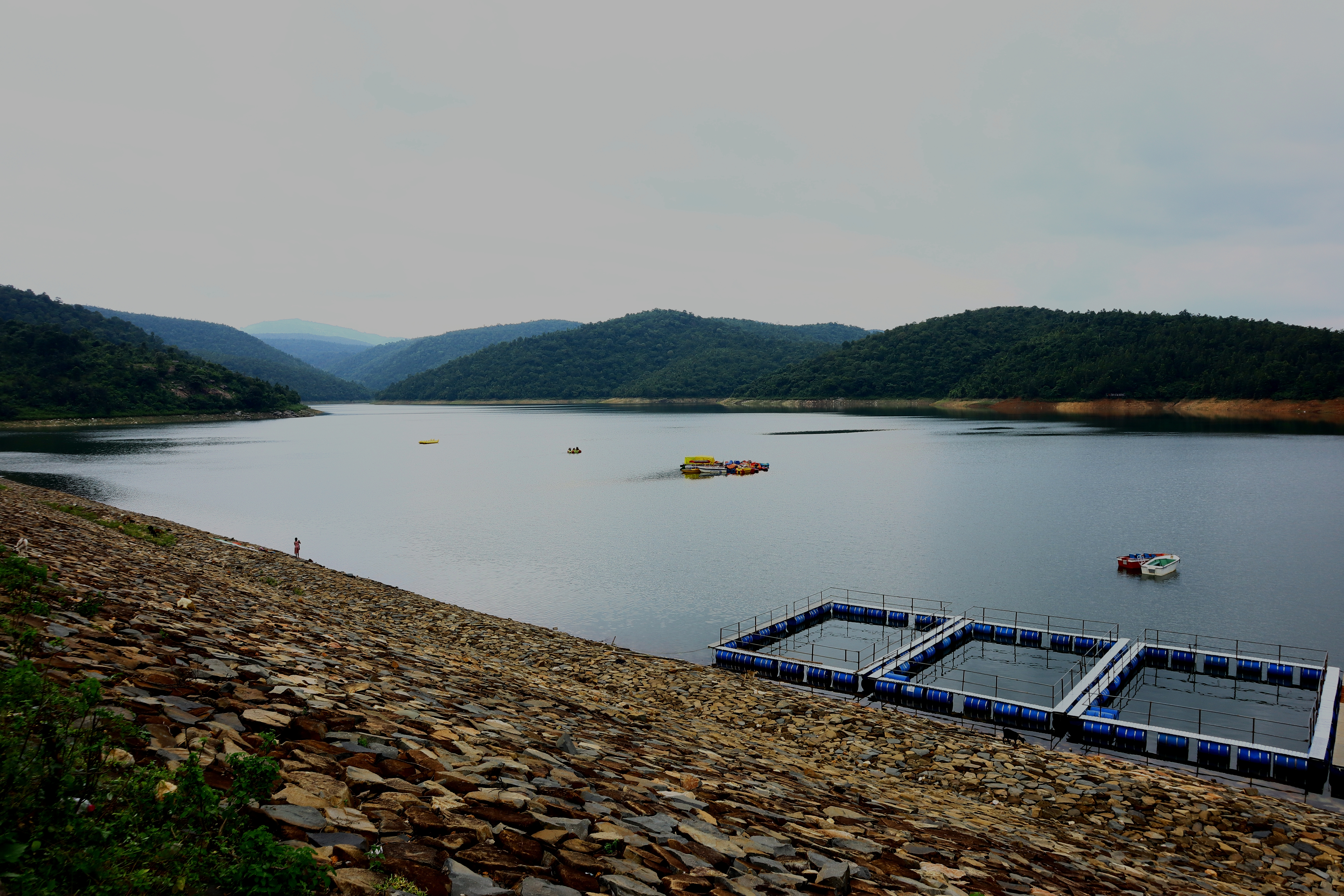

- Location within Bihar Location within India
- Interactive map of Nakti Dam Wildlife Sanctuary
- Nearest city: Jamui
- Coordinates: 24°49′3″N 86°24′0″E
- Area: 3.33 km^{2} (1.29 sq mi)
- Established: 22 July 1987

Nakti Dam Wildlife Sanctuary is a protected area and wildlife sanctuary located in Jamui district of the Indian state of Bihar.

== Description ==
The sanctuary covers an area of 3.33 km^{2} (1.29 sq mi) and was declared as a protected area on 22 July 1987.

The sanctuary hosts about 136 species of local and migratory birds. Major avifauna include Indian courser, sand grouse, yellow-wattled lapwing, Indian robin, and bar-headed goose.
