= Gumti Wildlife Sanctuary =

Wildlife century in India

- IUCN category IV (habitat/species management area)
- Location within Tripura Location within India
- Interactive map of Gumti Wildlife Sanctuary
- Location: South Tripura district, Tripura
- Nearest city: Udaipur
- Coordinates: 23°39′52″N 91°18′42″E
- Area: 389.54 km^{2} (150.40 sq mi)
- Established: 1988

Gumti Wildlife Sanctuary is a wildlife sanctuary in southern Tripura, India.

== Description ==
Gumti Wildlife Sanctuary encompasses an area of 389.54 km^{2} (150.40 sq mi) and was declared a protected area in 1988.

== Flora and fauna ==
The vegetation consists of deciduous and semi-evergreen forests. Major wildlife include the spectacled langur, capped langur, pig-tailed macaque, slow loris, barking deer, clouded leopard, wild boar, hoolock gibbon, leopard cat, crab-eating mongoose, porcupine and Indian python. Dumbur Lake within the sanctuary attracted nearly 17 migratory bird species and 126 native bird species earlier, with the bird visits declining significantly in the late 2010s.
