= Flora of India =

Plants native to India

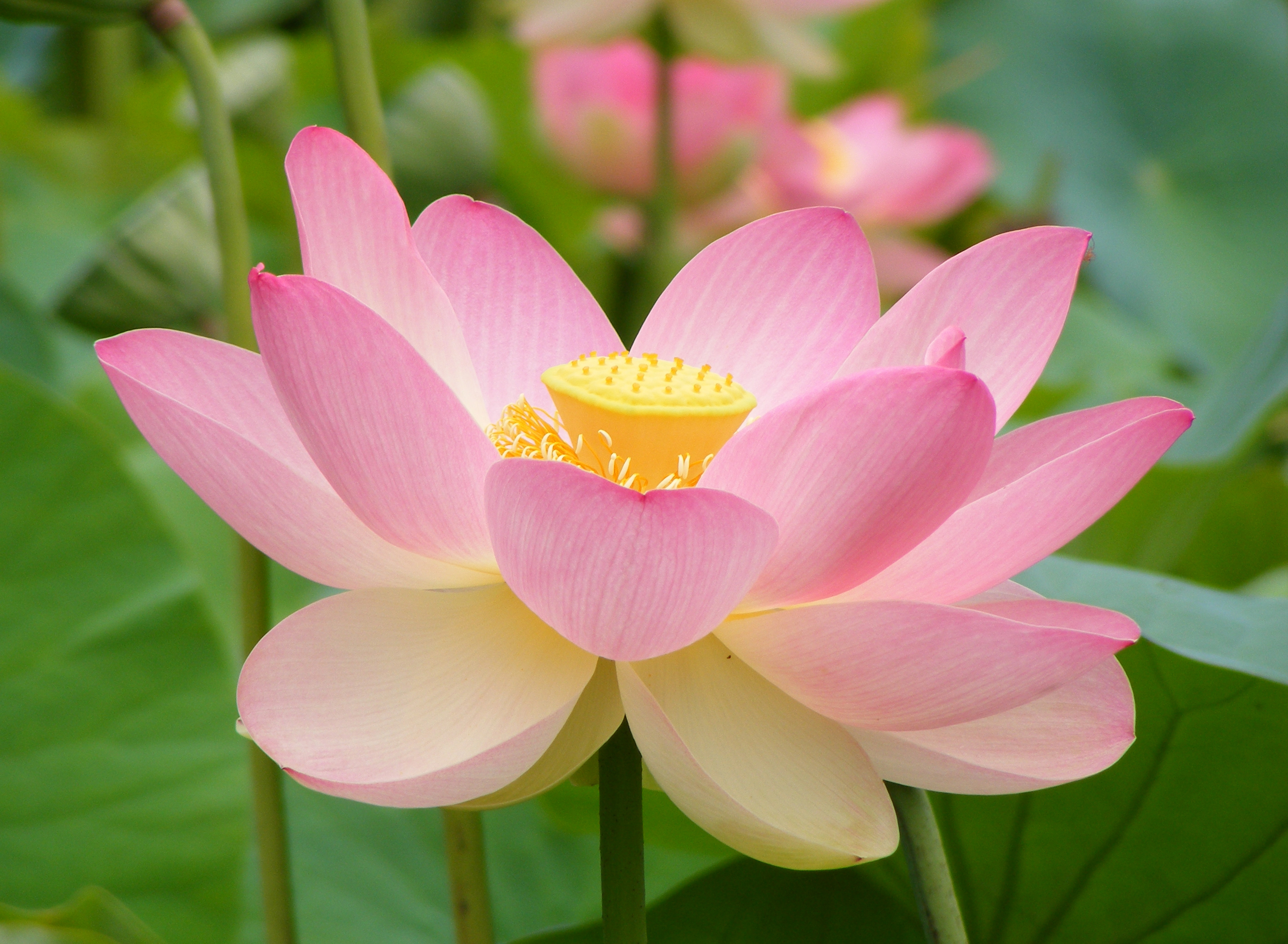
Lotus, the national flower of India

The flora of India is one of the richest in the world due to the wide range of climate, topology and habitat in the country.

== Floral diversity and medicinal plant wealth ==
There are estimated to be over 18,000 species of flowering plants in India, which constitute some 6-7 percent of the total plant species in the world. India is home to more than 50,000 species of plants, including a variety of endemics. The use of plants as a source of medicines has been an integral part of life in India from the earliest times. There are more than 3000 Indian plant species officially documented as possessing into eight main floristic regions : Western Himalayas, Eastern Himalayas, Assam, Indus plain, Ganges plain, the Deccan, Malabar and the Andaman Islands.

== Forest cover and vegetation diversity ==
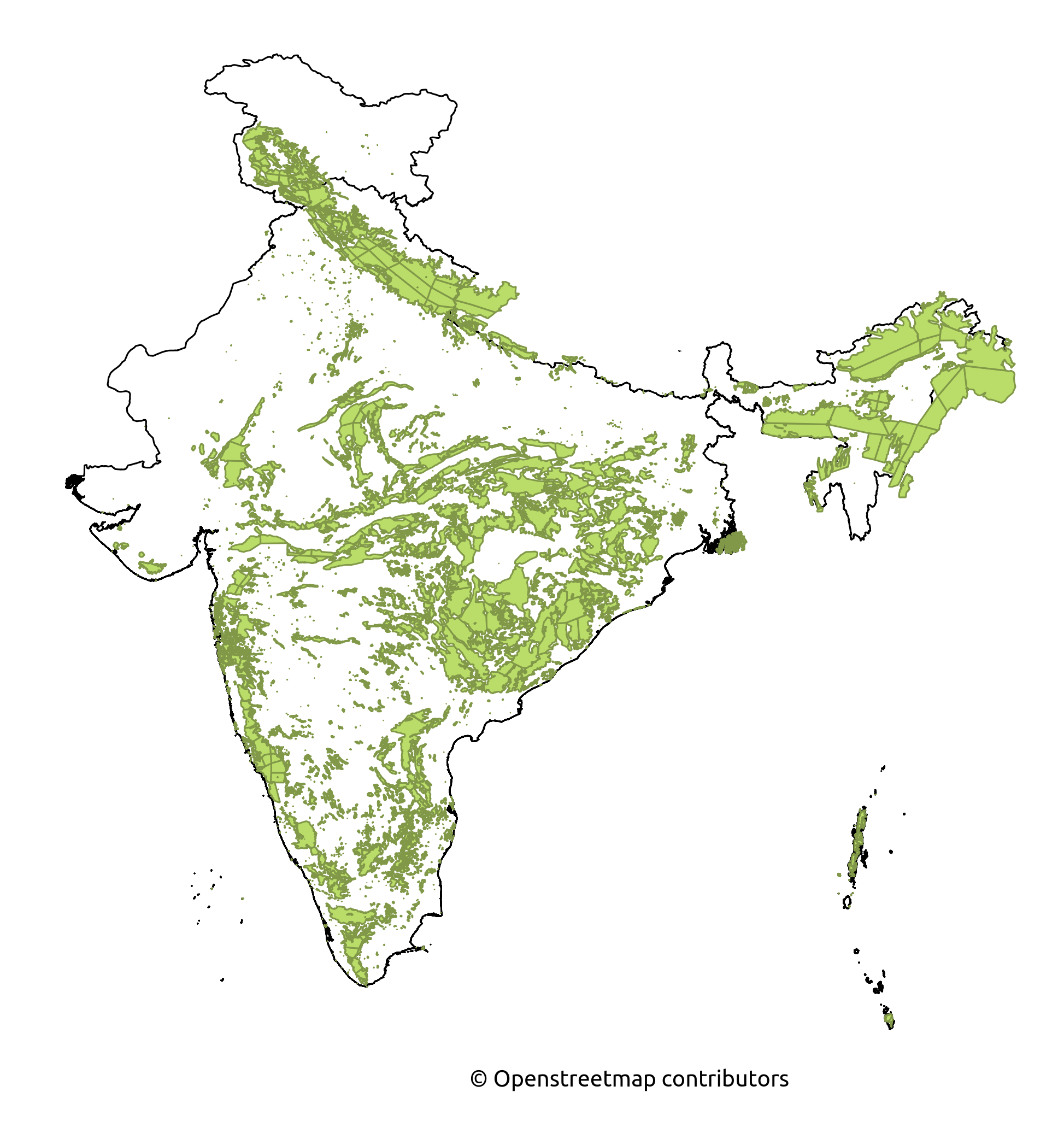
Indian Forest cover map as of 2015

In 1992, 743,534 km^{2} of land in the country was forested of which 92 percent was government land. This amounts to 22.7 percent land coverage, compared to the recommended 33 percent of the National Forest Policy Resolution 1952.

The majority of trees are broad-leaved deciduous, with one-sixth sal and one-tenth teak. Coniferous types are found in the northern high altitude regions and largely comprise pines, junipers and deodars.

India's forest cover ranges from the tropical rainforest of the Andaman Islands, Western Ghats, and Northeast India to the coniferous forest of the Himalaya. Between these extremes lie the sal-dominated moist deciduous forest of eastern India; teak-dominated dry deciduous forest of central and southern India; and the babul-dominated thorn forest of the central Deccan and western Gangetic plain. Pine, fir, spruce, cedar, larch and cypress are the timber-yielding plants widely prevalent throughout the hilly regions of India.

== Vegetation diversity and floristic wealth ==
India's great diversity of climates, from tropical to arctic, contribute to its extraordinarily rich and varied vegetation. From the coniferous and alpine forests of the Western and Eastern Himalayas to the evergreen woods of Assam, the dry vegetation of the Indus plain, and the mixed deciduous forests of the Deccan, the nation is separated into eight floristic areas, each with its own unique plant communities.

== Plant diversity and conservation status ==
The Andaman Islands are renowned for its mangrove and evergreen forests, while the humid Malabar region is home to both lush forests and important plantation crops. With about 46,000 known plant species, of which roughly 15,000 make up the primary vascular flora, India is ranked eighth in the world for plant variety. Over 800 plant species are utilized by tribal people, according to ethnobotanical research conducted by the Botanical Survey of India (BSI). However, habitat degradation has put some 1,336 species in danger, and about 20 may already be extinct. As a result, BSI published the Red Data Book to list endangered plants.

== See also ==
- Indian Council of Forestry Research and Education
- List of endemic and threatened plants of India
