= Valmiki National Park =

National park in Bihar, India

- Valmiki Tiger Reserve and Wildlife Sanctuary
- IUCN category II (national park)
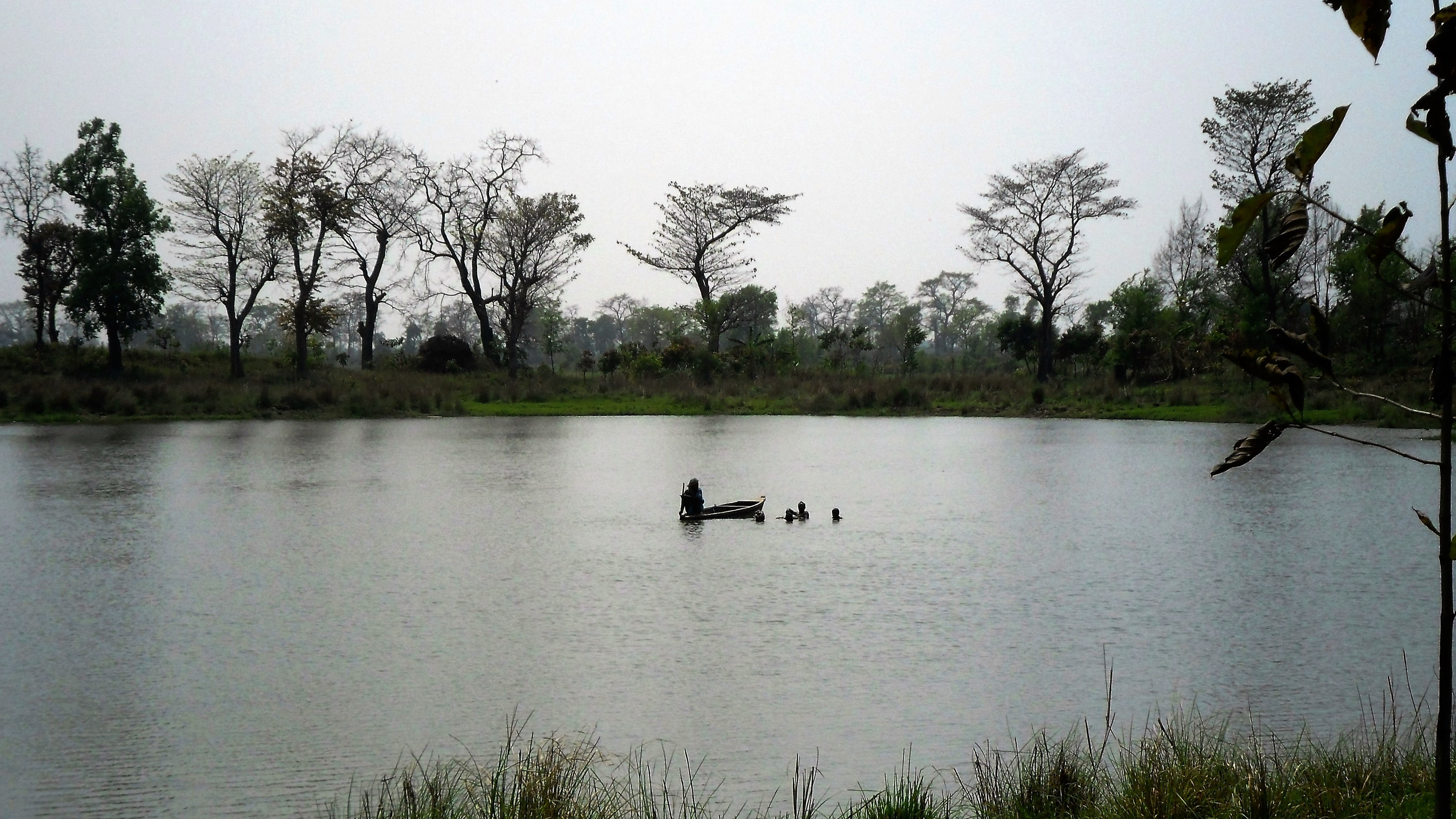
- A lake in Darua Bari

- Location within Bihar Location within India
- Interactive map of Valmiki National Park
- Location: West Champaran District, Bihar, India
- Nearest city: Bettiah
- Coordinates: 27°19′54″N 84°9′45″E
- Area: 898.45 km^{2} (346.89 sq mi)
- Established: 1978
- Governing body: Government of Bihar
- Website: https://www.valmikitigerreserve.com/

Valmiki National Park is a national park and tiger reserve in the West Champaran District of Bihar, India covering 898.45 km^{2} (346.89 sq mi). It is the only National park in Bihar.

== History ==
The extensive forest area of Valmikinagar was owned by the Bettiah Raj and Ramanagar Raj until the early 1950s. It was declared a Wildlife Sanctuary in 1978. Valmiki National Park was established in 1990. Valmiki Wildlife Sanctuary and National Park is the 18th Tiger Reserve of the country.

== Geography ==
Valmiki National Park is located in West Champaran district. In the north, it is bordered by Nepal's Chitwan National Park and in the west by Uttar Pradesh. Its total forest area comprises about 900 km^{2} (350 sq mi), out of which the Valmiki Wildlife Sanctuary is 880 km^{2} (340 sq mi) and spread of the National Park is about 335 km^{2} (129 sq mi) area.

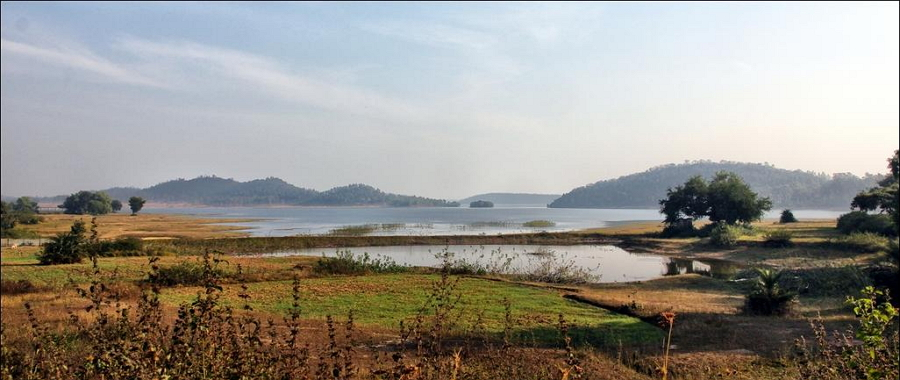
Himalayan foothills of Valmikinagar, Bihar

The landscape of Valmiki National Park encompasses foothills of the Sivalik Hills with a mosaic of the cliffs, ridges and gorges, hills, streams and valleys, dense forests, open woodlands, grasslands, swamps and riverine fringe. Situated in Gangetic plains bio-geographic zone of the country, the forest has combination of bhabar and terai tracts. Boulder and pebble deposits by the Himalayan rivers in foothills characterized the Bhabar tract while the finer sediments deposits feature Terai lands.

Older alluvium with sandy soil with variegated clay and loose boulder deposits and artesian flows; lateritic formations on higher contours and newer Alluvium on southern parts with reissuing springs akin to artesian flows.

Criss-crossing and meandering rivers, streams and rivulets, man-made canals; swamps and grasslands are featured on these lands. River Gandak forms the western boundary of Valmiki wildlife sanctuary. It enters in India at Valmikinagar, where two rivulets Sonha and Pachnad joins it, forming a holy confluence ‘Triveni’. Harha – Masan River system originates from the Valmiki Forests and forms Burhi Gandak River further south. River Pandai flows into Bihar from Nepal in the eastern end of the Sanctuary and meets Masan.

== Flora ==
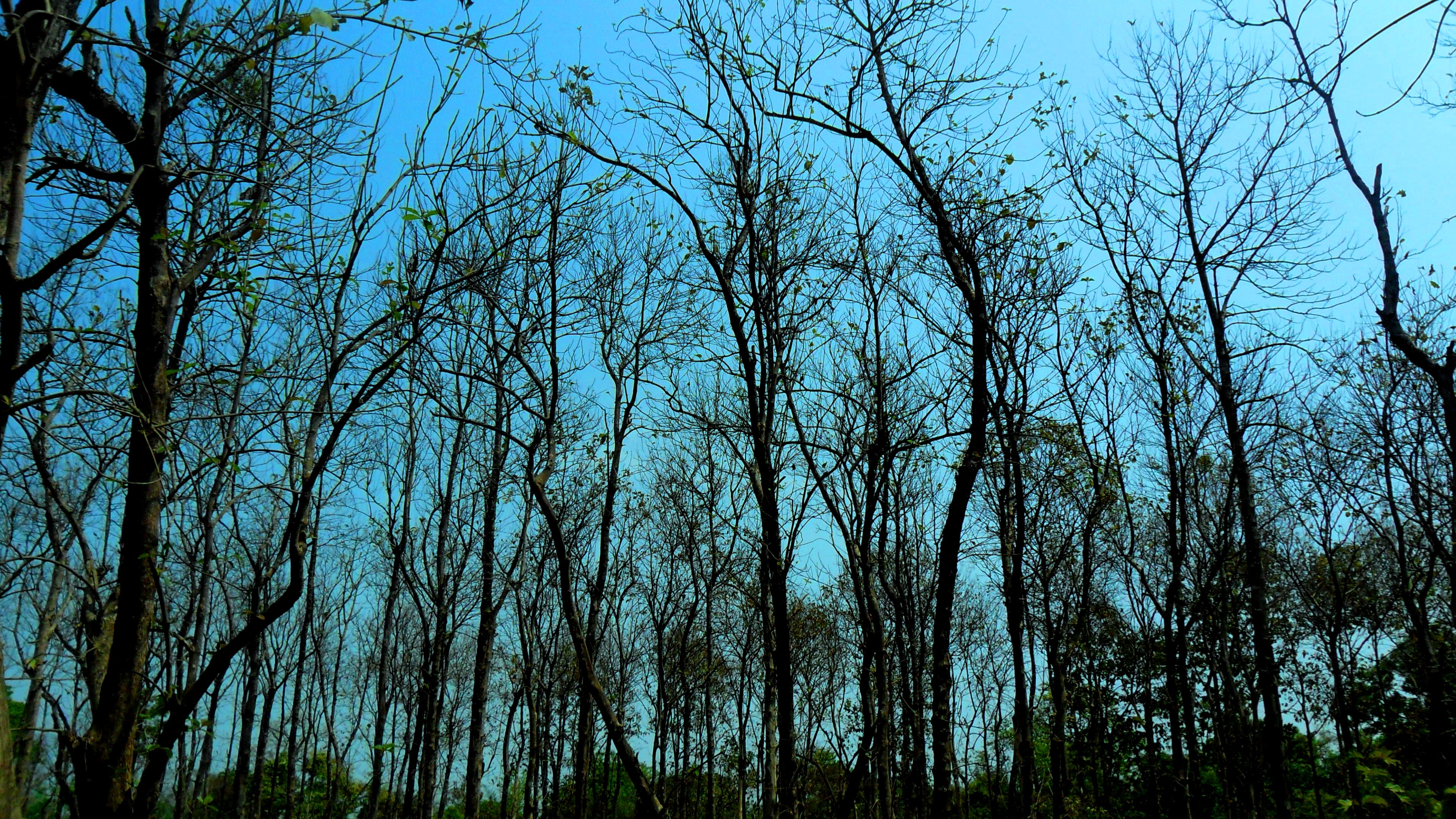
Jungle in Valmiki National Park

As per Champion and Seth classification, there are seven forest types:

- Bhabar – Dun Sal Forest
- Dry Siwalik Sal Forest
- West Gangetic Moist Mixed Deciduous Forest
- Khair – Sissoo Forest
- Cane Brakes
- Eastern Wet Alluvial Grassland
- Barringtonia Swamp Forest

Due to diverse topographical and edaphic factors, the reserve harbors varied vegetation types. The Botanical Survey of India has categorized seven vegetation types within the limits of the national park:

- Moist mixed deciduous
- Open – land vegetation
- Sub-mountainous semi-evergreen formation
- Freshwater swamps
- Riparian fringes
- Alluvial grasslands and high hill savannah
- Wetlands

The important tree species are sal (Shorea robusta), karam (Adina cordifolia), asan (Terminalia tomentosa), bahera (Terminalia bellirica), asidh (Lagerstroemia parviflora), simal (Bombax ceiba) and satsal (Dalbergia latifolia). In hilly regions, piyar (Buchanania lanzan), mandar (Dillenia aurea), banjan (Anogeissus latifolia), bhelwa (Semecarpus anacardium), harra (Terminalia chebula), bodera (Eugenia operculata) occur. There is a special attraction of cane brakes in Madanpur Forest block. There is a small isolated patch of chir pine (Pinus roxburghii) forest in Raghia Forest block at the elevation of 300–520 m (1,000–1,700 ft). Grasses are represented by munj (Tripidium bengalense), kans (Saccharum spontaneum), elephant grass (Typha elephantina), narkat (Phragmites karka), Vitiveria zizanioides, Imperata cylindrica, choranth (Heteropogon contortus), sabai (Eulaliopsis binata). Common climbers are mahulan (Phanera vahlii), mahai (Butea parviflora), panilat (Vitis repanda), ramdatwan (Smilax parviflora) and arar (Acacia pinnate). Medicinal plants include satawar (Asparagus racemosus), safed Musli, dudhkoraiya (Wrightia antidysenterica), amla (Phyllanthus emblica) and piper (Piper longum).

== Fauna ==
=== Mammals ===
The wildlife in the forest of Valmiki National Park are the Bengal tiger, Indian rhinoceros, Asian elephant, Asiatic black bear and sloth bear.

=== Reptiles ===
The reptiles in Valmiki National Park are pythons, king cobra, banded krait and sand boa. Gharials occur in River Gandak.

=== Birds ===
At present 241 bird species have been reported to be present in Valmiki National Park, including kalij pheasant, quail, paradise flycatcher, grey shrike, tree pipit, green barbet, waders, ibises, storks, pitta, plovers, snipes, Oriental pied hornbill, white-eared night heron, emerald dove, several owls, spotted owlet and nightjars. There are five species of green pigeons and common wood pigeon.

=== Butterflies ===
The jungle of Valmiki National Park abounds in moths, caterpillars and butterflies, including the common Mormon, great Mormon, glassy tiger, great eggfly, club beak, grey pansy, lime butterfly and common crow.
