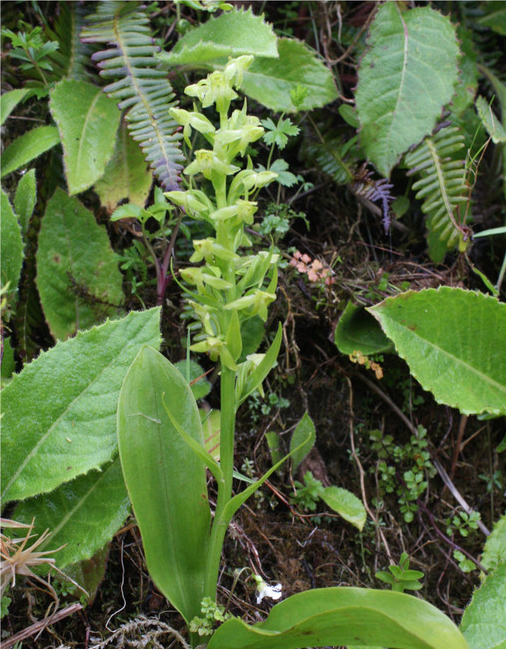

Scientific classification
- Kingdom: Plantae
- Clade: Tracheophytes
- Clade: Angiosperms
- Clade: Monocots
- Order: Asparagales
- Family: Orchidaceae
- Subfamily: Orchidoideae
- Genus: Platanthera
- Species: P. azorica

Binomial name
- Platanthera azorica (Schltr.)

= Platanthera azorica =

Hochstetter's butterfly orchid

Species of orchid

Platanthera azorica, commonly known as Hochstetter's butterfly orchid, is a species of orchid in the genus Platanthera. It was "rediscovered" in 2011 on a single volcanic ridge on the central Azores island of São Jorge, and "is arguably Europe's rarest bona fide orchid species." While P. azorica was previously considered by some sources to be the same as Platanthera micrantha, the 2011 discovery triggered a thorough analysis of historic and current data and specimens, resulting in three species identified.

== Distribution ==
At the time of its rediscovery, the species was only known to grow in a single small upland area of São Jorge. The same island was not included in Hochstetter's expedition, meaning that the specimen that was originally collected in 1838 was from another island. A 2017 discovery of a flowering specimen in the neighboring island of Faial reaffirmed its presence in other islands of the archipelago.

== Origin ==
Genetic testing confirms that the lineage of the species derives from Europe or North Africa, rather than North America as had been previously hypothesized, and evidence suggests "that the Azorean lineage represents a single migration of seed to the archipelago from a mainland European population [...]"

== Description ==
There are now three distinct species of Azorean butterfly orchids:

- P. azorica Schlt.: The exceptionally rare rediscovered species is now correctly identified as P. azorica, commonly named Hochstetter's butterfly orchid in honor of German botanist Karl Hochstetter. Hochstetter originally found a specimen in 1838 during a scientific expedition to six of the nine Azores islands, which was not distinguished from the other species. The flower is "exceptionally large" compared to the other two species.
- P. micrantha (Hochst.) Schltr.: The misidentified species previously known as P. azorica is now correctly named P. micrantha, commonly named the narrow-lipped butterfly orchid. Found on eight of the nine islands, it is much more rare than P. pollostantha, occurring in smaller, scattered populations.
- P. pollostantha: The misidentified species previously known as P. micrantha is now redescribed as P. pollostantha, sp. nov., commonly named the short-spurred butterfly orchid. This is the most common of the three species, and is found on all nine islands of the Azores.

== Conservation status ==
The previously known P. micrantha was listed by the IUCN Red List of Threatened Species as Vulnerable, but that was under the assumption that all three Azorean butterfly orchids comprised a single species. Justification was given that the population is decreasing due to threats such as destruction of the habitat to create pastures, invasive plants and road construction.

The 2013 study that described the three distinct species stated that the prior Red List threat assessment be overturned because the species is Europe's rarest bona fide orchid species, and P. micrantha, an equally rare species, is a good indicator for the amount of semi-natural laurisilva habitats remaining on the Azores.
