= Cheilanthes fimbriata =

Cheilanthes fimbriata is the name of a fern species, which may refer to:

- Cheilanthes fimbriata Vis., described in 1842, now known as Aleuritopteris persicus
- Cheilanthes fimbriata Mickel & Beitel, combined in 1988, an illegitimate later homonym, now known as Myriopteris fimbriata
