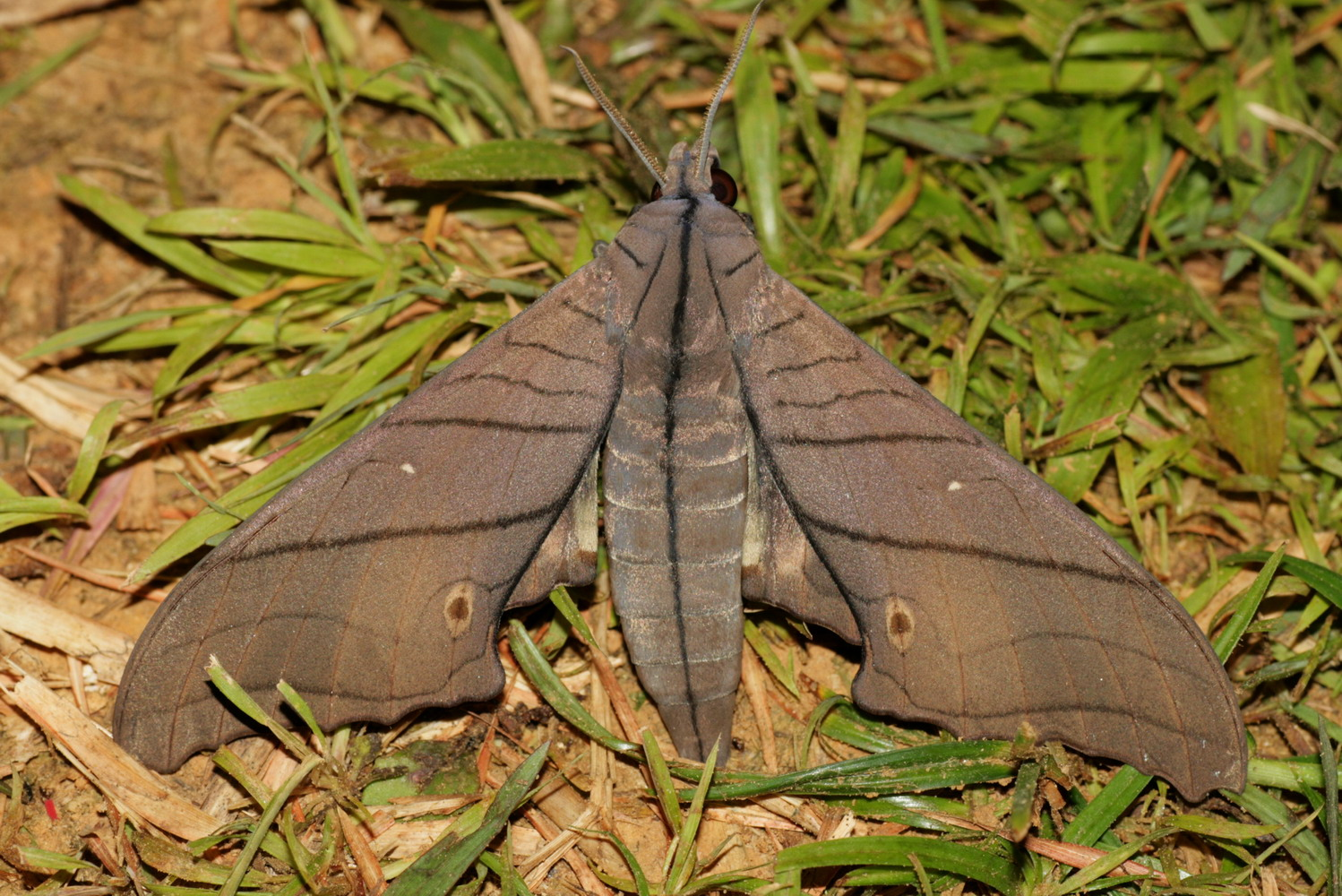

Scientific classification
- Domain: Eukaryota
- Kingdom: Animalia
- Phylum: Arthropoda
- Class: Insecta
- Order: Lepidoptera
- Family: Sphingidae
- Genus: Marumba
- Species: M. cristata

Binomial name
- Marumba cristata Butler, 1875

Synonyms
- Triptogon cristata Butler, 1875; Marumba cristata jodeides d'Abrera, 1987; Marumba cristata ochrea Mell, 1922

= Marumba cristata =

Species of moth

Marumba cristata, the common striped hawkmoth, is a species of moth of the family Sphingidae. It is found from the Himalaya, through Nepal and north-east India, Myanmar, southern and central China to western Malaysia (Sundaland).

== Description ==
The wingspan is 100–124 mm.

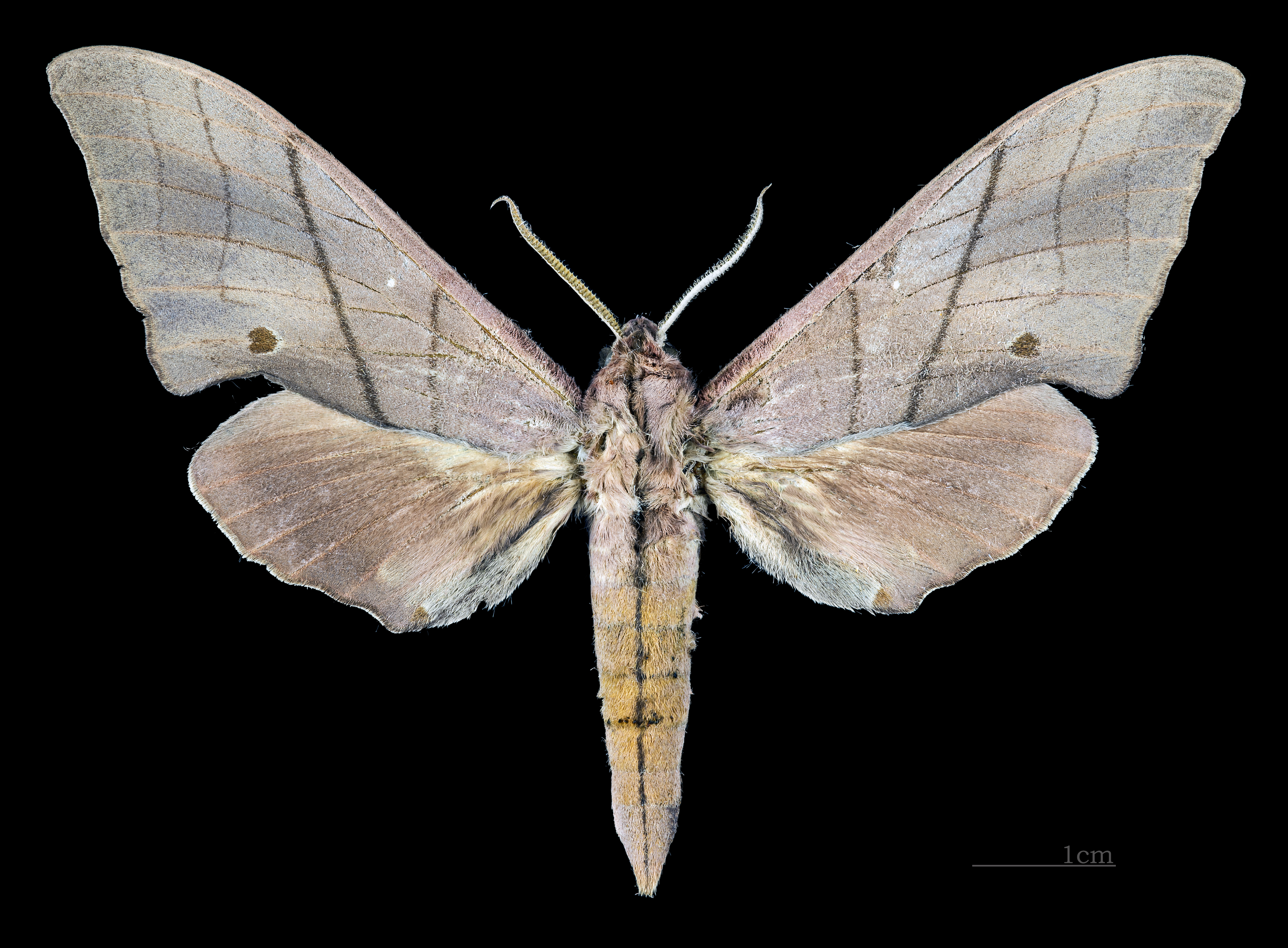
Male M. c. cristata

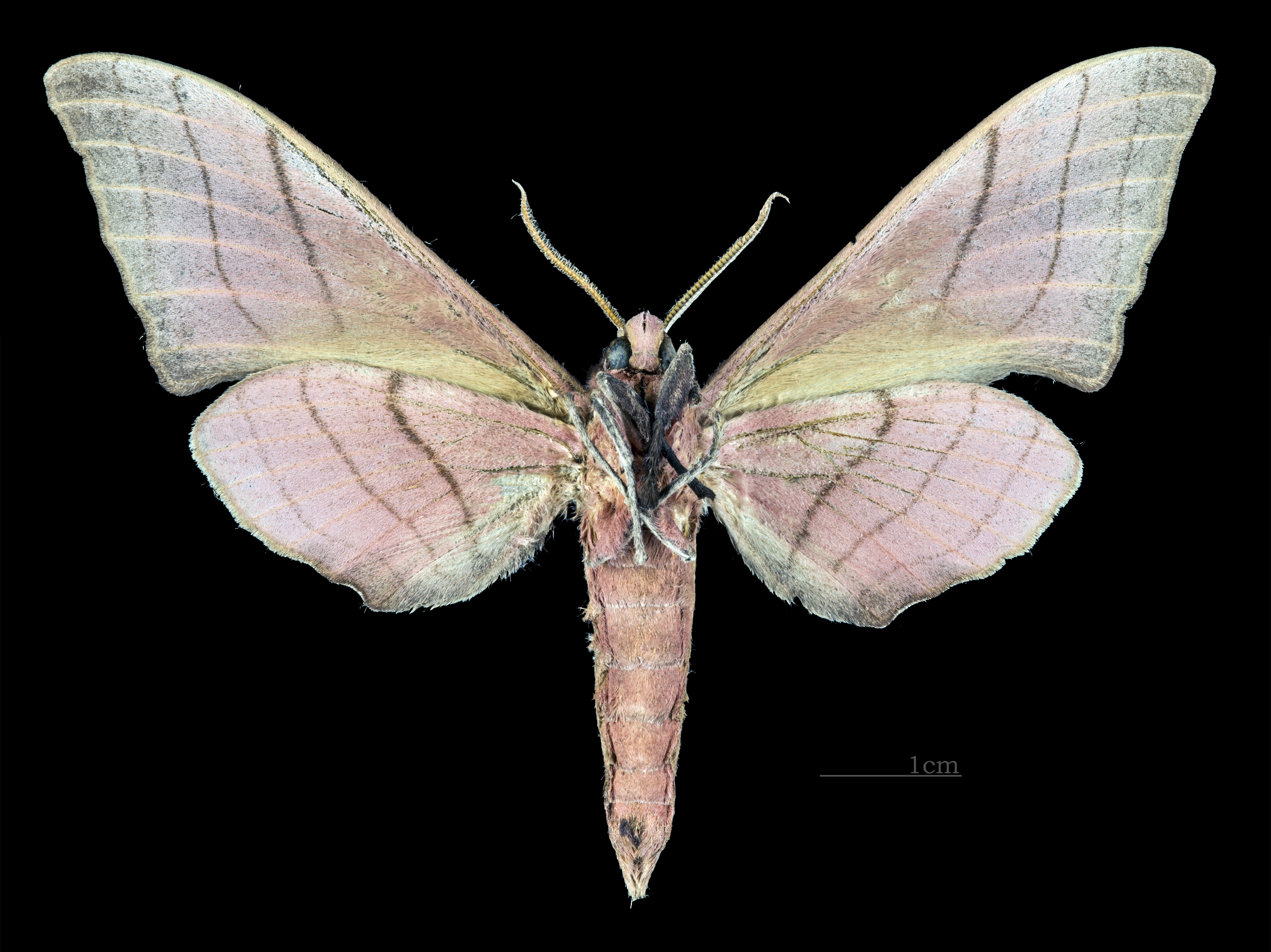
Male M. c. cristata, underside

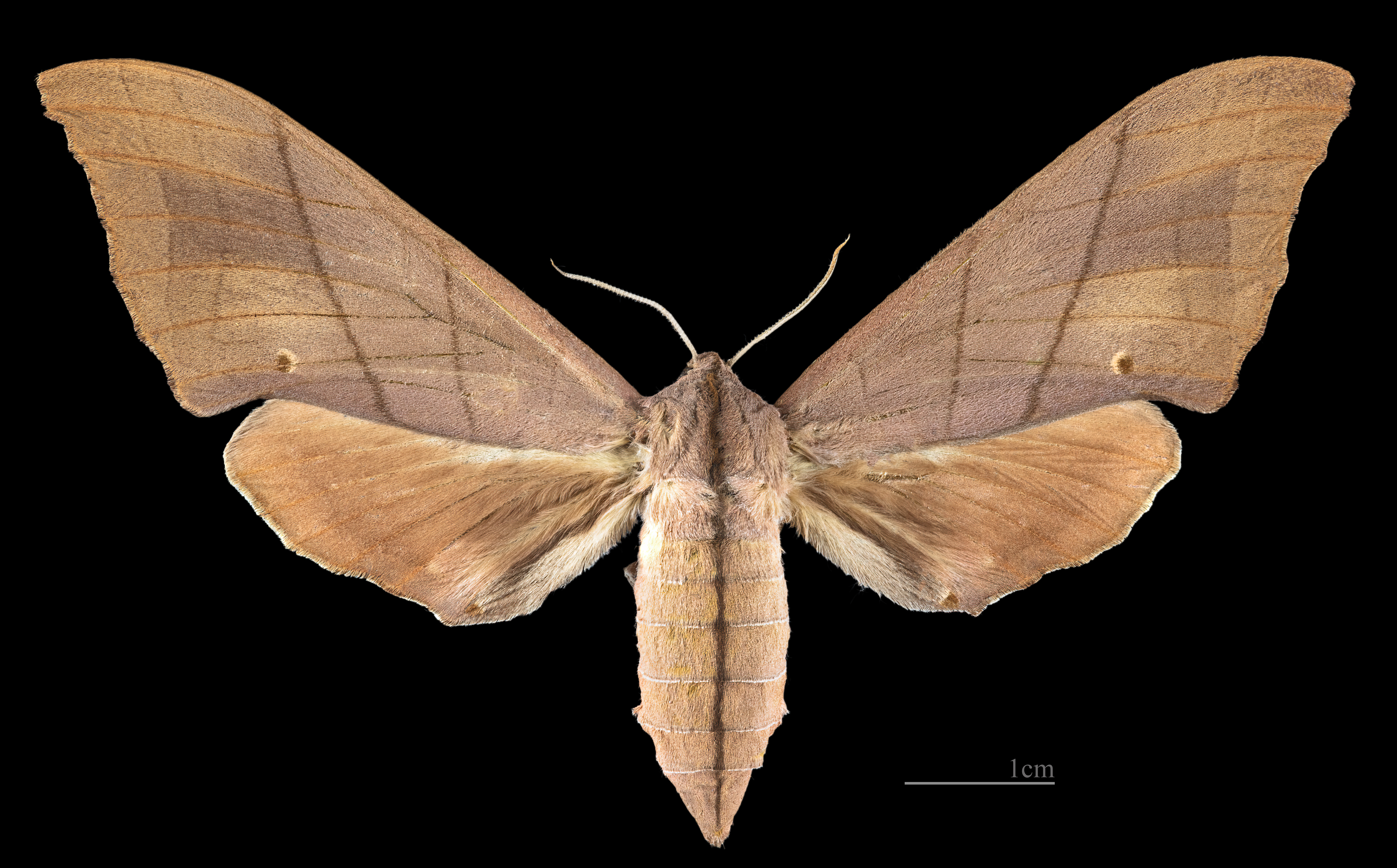
Female Marumba cristata cristata

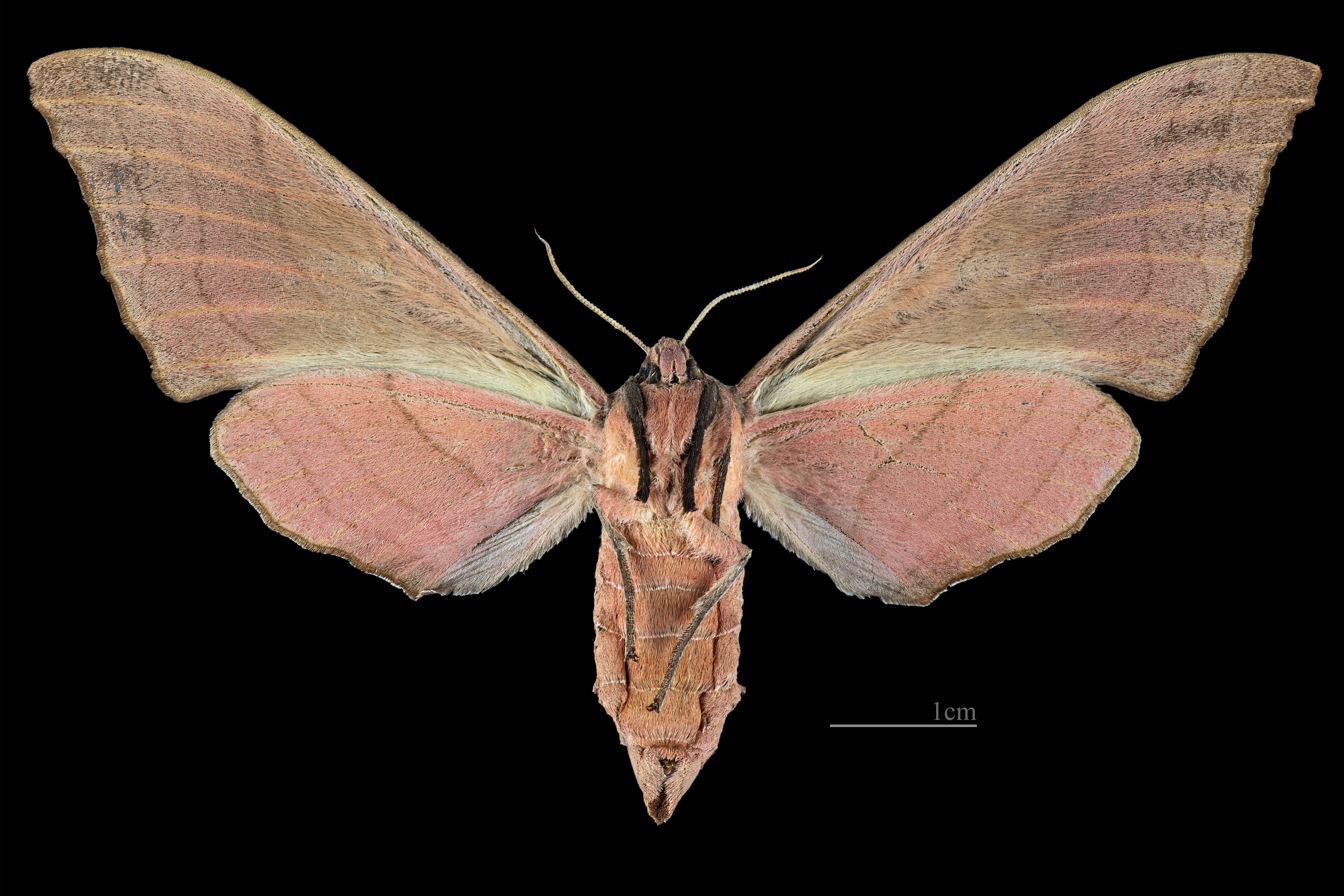
FemaleMarumba cristata cristataunderside

== Biology ==
Adults are on wing in June and July in China. Larvae have been recorded on Litsea elongata, Machilus ichangensis and Phoebe (Lauraceae) species.

== Subspecies ==
- Marumba cristata cristata (from Himachal Pradesh (India) across Nepal and northeastern India to southern, central and northern China, northern Thailand, Laos and northern Vietnam)
- Marumba cristata bukaiana Clark, 1937 (endemic to Taiwan)
- Marumba cristata titan Rothschild, 1920 (Malaysia)
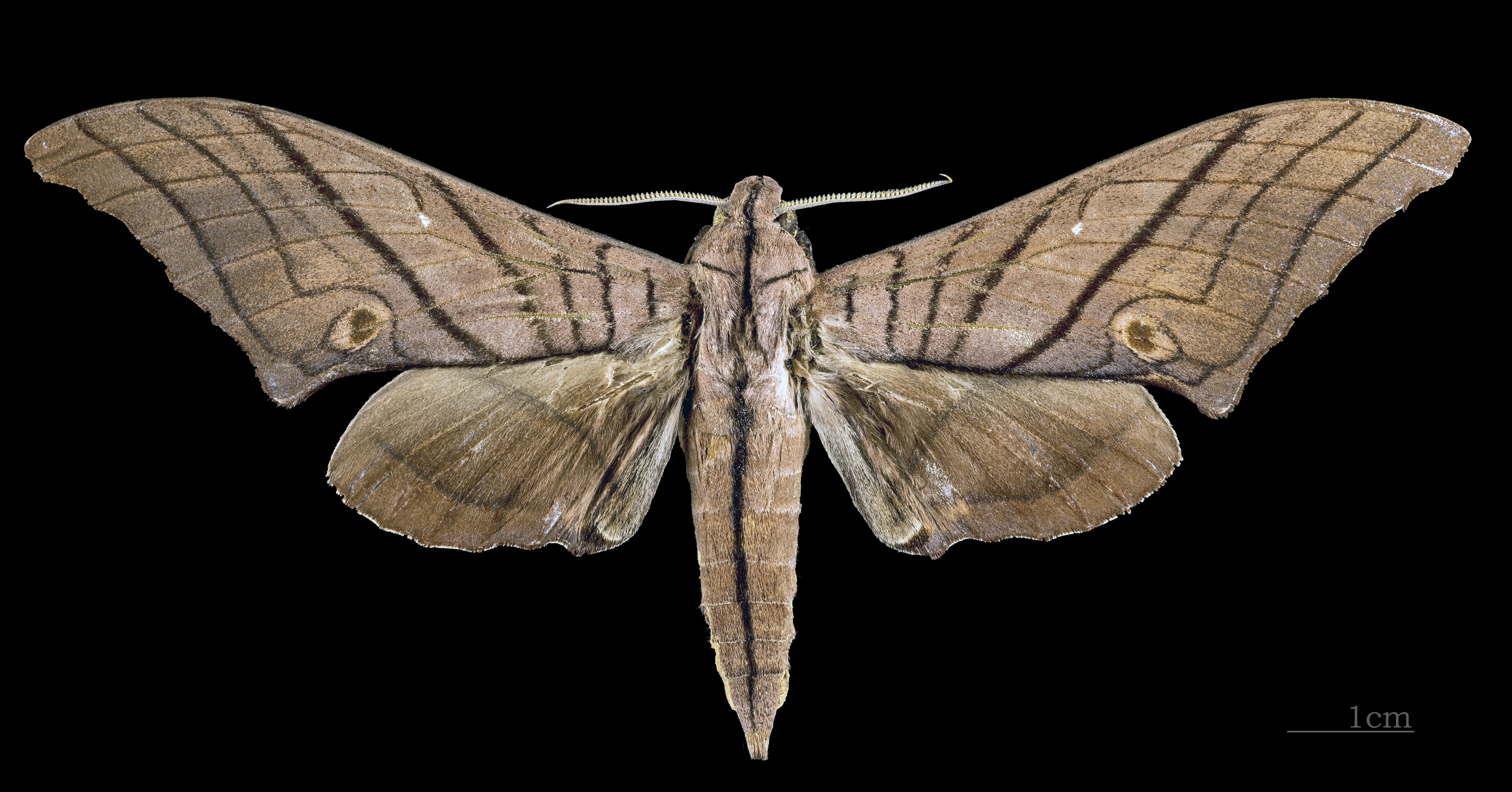
Male M. c. titan

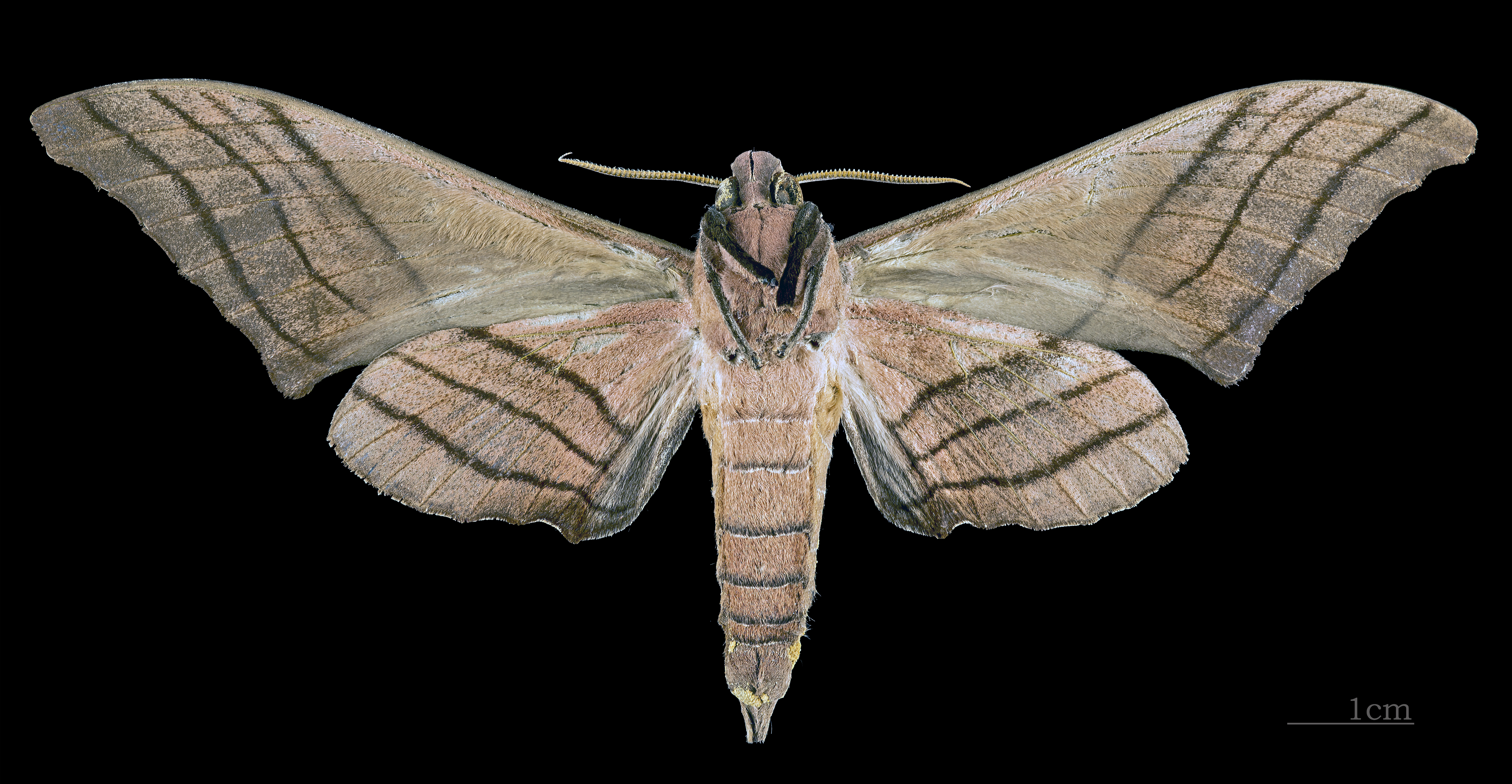
Male M. c. titan, underside

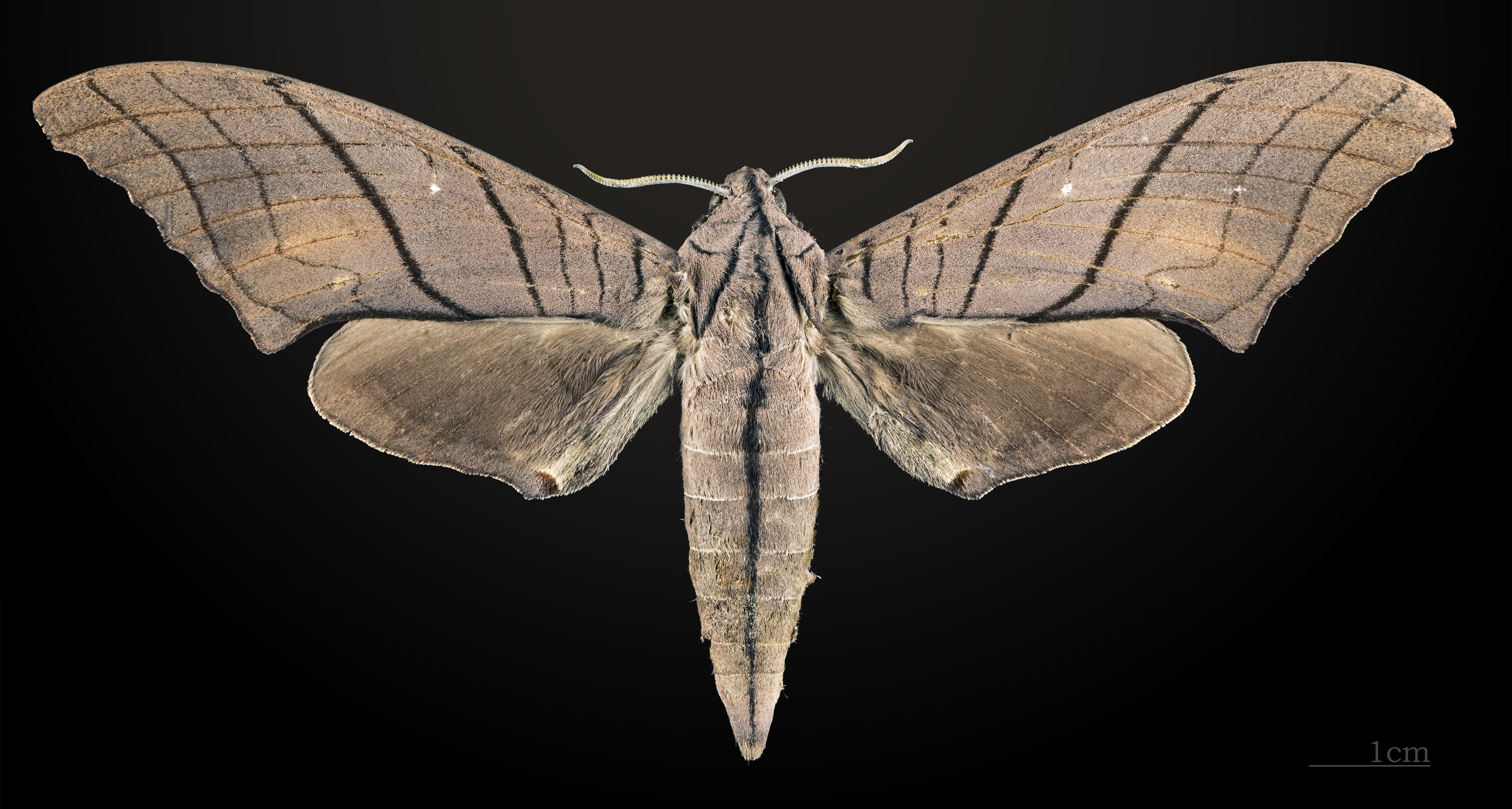
Female M. c. titan

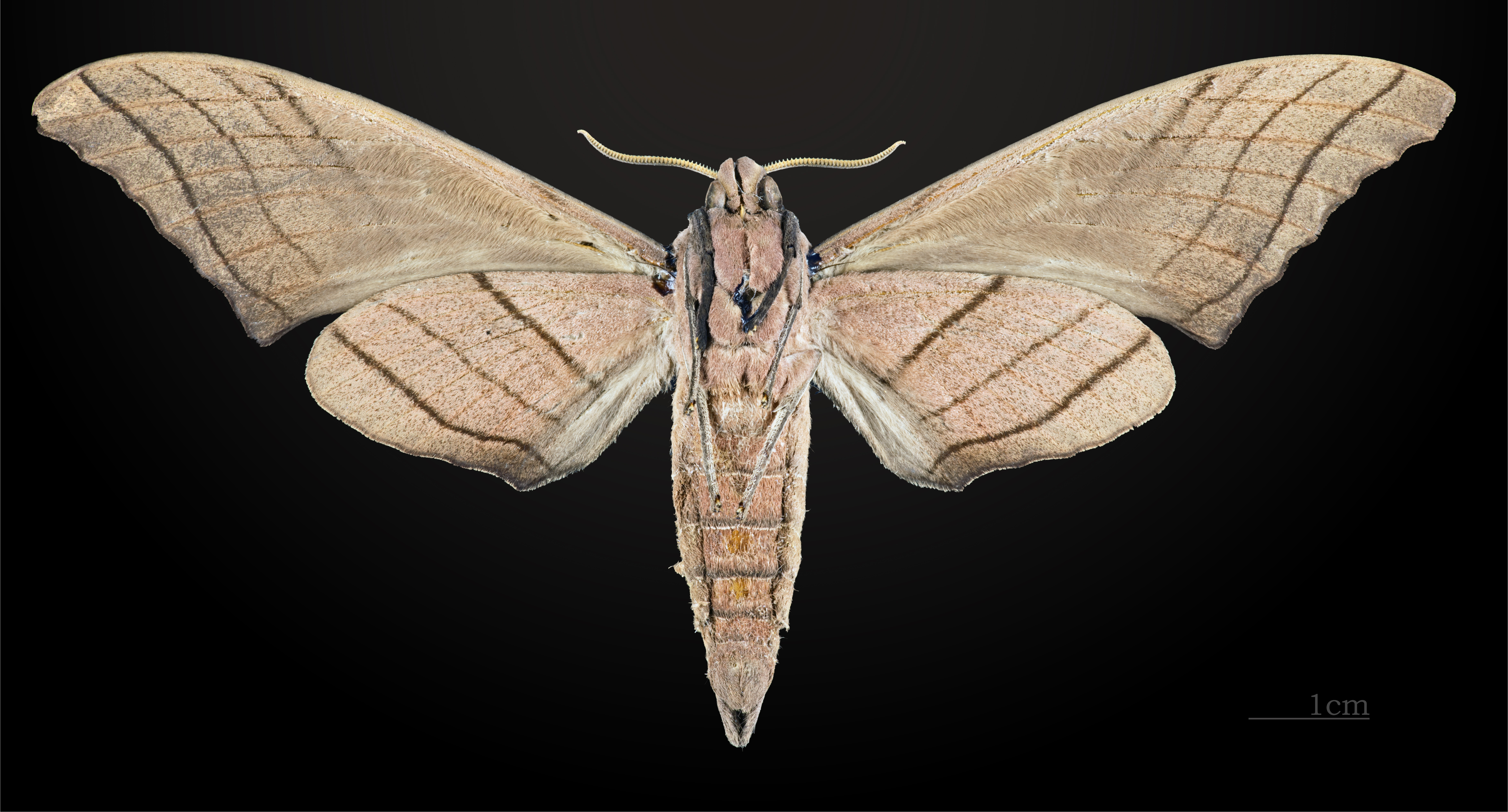
Female M. c. titan, underside

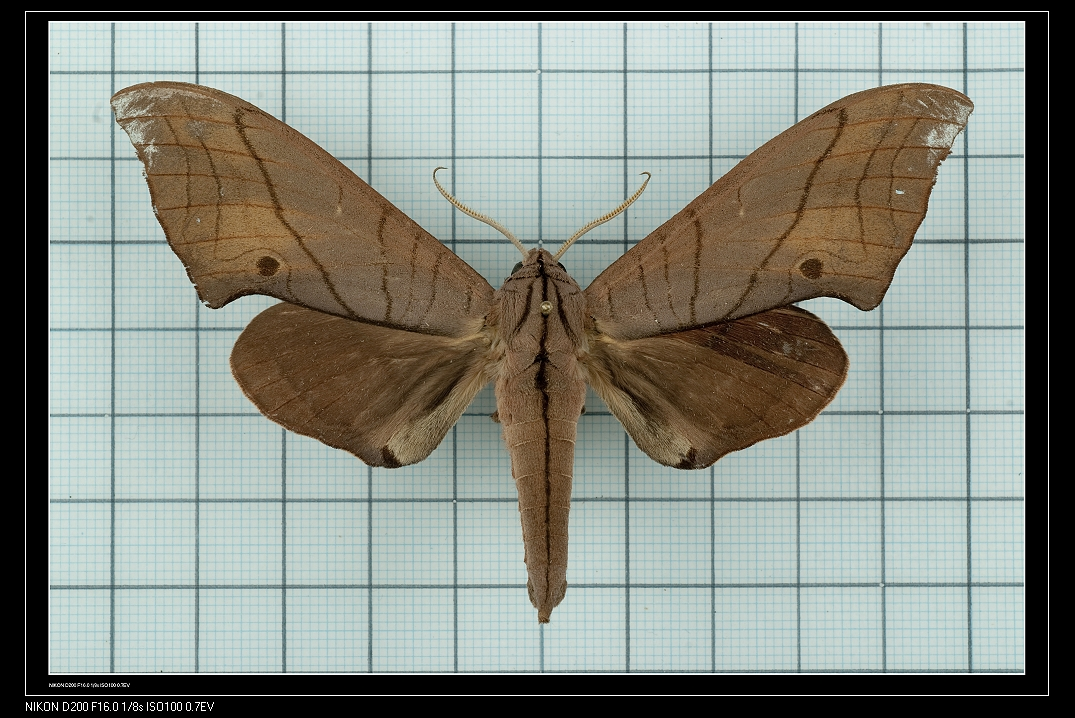
M. c.bukaian
