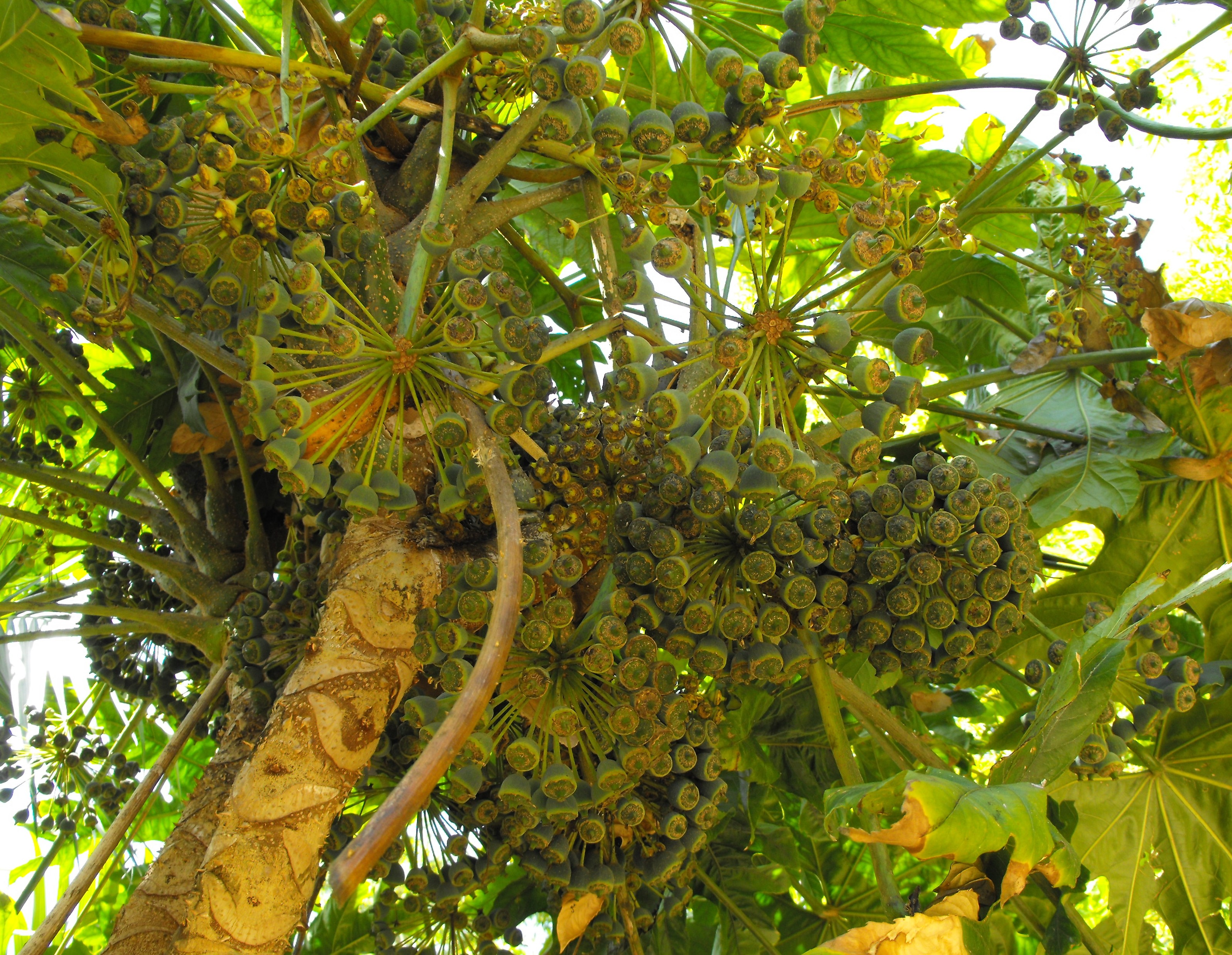
- Trevesia palmata

Scientific classification
- Kingdom: Plantae
- Clade: Tracheophytes
- Clade: Angiosperms
- Clade: Eudicots
- Clade: Asterids
- Order: Apiales
- Family: Araliaceae
- Subfamily: Aralioideae
- Genus: Trevesia; Vis., 1842

Species
- 7, see text

Synonyms
- Plerandropsis R.Vig.

= Trevesia =

Genus of plants

Trevesia is a genus of flowering plants in the family Araliaceae. They are native to Southeast Asia. They are trees with spiny trunks. They grow in evergreen forest habitat. The genus is characterized by palmately lobed leaves, pedicels lacking articulations, at least six petals per flower, and at least six locules per ovary.

There are 7 species.

Species include:

- Trevesia arborea
- Trevesia beccarii
- Trevesia burckii
- Trevesia lateospina
- Trevesia palmata
- Trevesia sundaica
- Trevesia valida
