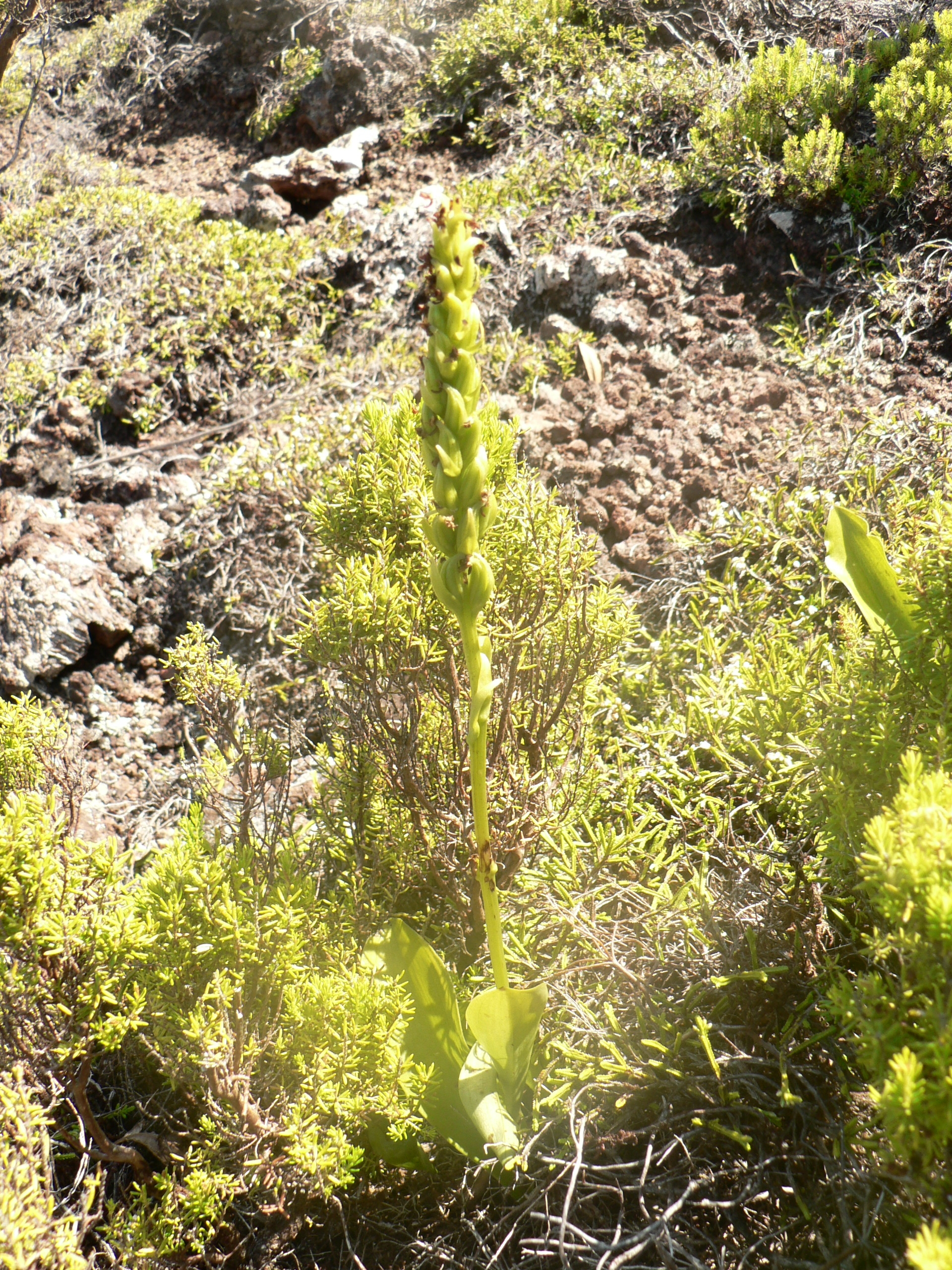

Conservation status
- Endangered (IUCN 3.1)

Scientific classification
- Kingdom: Plantae
- Clade: Tracheophytes
- Clade: Angiosperms
- Clade: Monocots
- Order: Asparagales
- Family: Orchidaceae
- Subfamily: Orchidoideae
- Genus: Platanthera
- Species: P. micrantha

Binomial name
- Platanthera micrantha (Lowe)

= Platanthera micrantha =

Species of orchid

Platanthera micrantha (formerly P. azorica) or the narrow-lipped butterfly orchid is a species of orchid in the genus Platanthera endemic to the Azores. It is an endangered species and is closely related to P. azorica and P. pollostantha, also endemic to the Azores.

== Distribution ==
It occurs on eight islands of the archipelago but is restricted to small, scattered populations in laurisilva scrub.

Platanthera micrantha is one of the best indicators of semi-natural laurisilva habitats remaining on the Azores.
