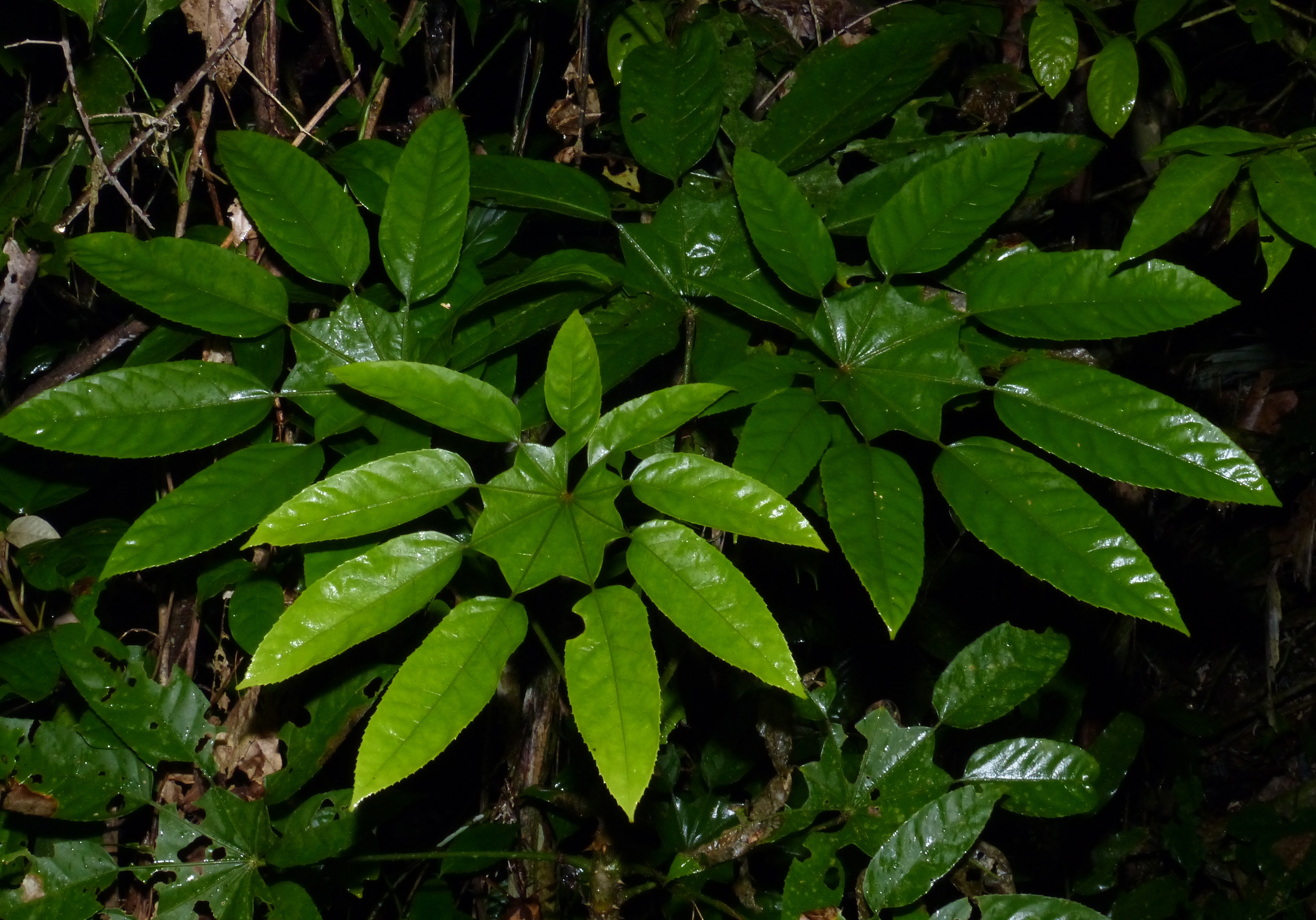

Scientific classification
- Kingdom: Plantae
- Clade: Tracheophytes
- Clade: Angiosperms
- Clade: Eudicots
- Clade: Asterids
- Order: Apiales
- Family: Araliaceae
- Genus: Trevesia
- Species: T. burckii

Binomial name
- Trevesia burckii Boerl. 1887

= Trevesia burckii =

Species of plant in the family Araliaceae

Trevesia burckii is a flowering plant in the family Araliaceae found from Sumatra to Borneo
