= Dodecadenia =

Conservation status
- Least Concern (IUCN 3.1)

Scientific classification
- Kingdom: Plantae
- Clade: Tracheophytes
- Clade: Angiosperms
- Clade: Magnoliids
- Order: Laurales
- Family: Lauraceae
- Genus: Dodecadenia; Nees
- Species: D. grandiflora

Binomial name
- Dodecadenia grandiflora Nees

Synonyms
- Actinodaphne monantha (Yen C.Yang & P.H.Huang) H.P.Tsui; Dodecadenia grandiflora var.griffithii (Hook.f.) D.G.Long; Dodecadenia griffithii Hook.f.; Laurus macrophylla D.Don; Laurus pallens Meisn.; Laurus pubescens D.Don ex Nees; Litsea grandiflora (Nees) Kosterm.; Litsea monantha Yen C.Yang & P.H.Huang; Tetranthera grandiflora Wall.

Genus of plants

Dodecadenia is a botanical genus of flowering plants in the family Lauraceae. It contains a single species, Dodecadenia grandiflora. It native to the Himalayas, northeastern India, Bangladesh, Myanmar, and south-central China. It is present in tropical and subtropical montane rainforest, laurel forest, in the weed-tree forests in valleys, mixed forests of coniferous and deciduous broad-leaved trees, Tsuga forests; 2,000–2,600 metres (6,600–8,500 ft) in China in provinces of Sichuan, Tibet, Yunnan, and countries of Bhutan, India, Myanmar, and Nepal.

The genus was described by Christian Gottfried Daniel Nees von Esenbeck and published in Plant Asiaticae Rariores 2: 63 in 1831. The type species is Dodecadenia grandiflora Nees.

== Habitat ==
The genus was more extended in the Tertiary. The ecological requirements of the genus, are those of fog moisture precipitating almost continuously in a natural habitat cloud-covered for much of the year. These genus species are found in tropical forests, subtropical temperate evergreen, montane evergreen forests, which is a type of rainforest or Cloud Forest.

In the Indian Central Himalaya, the Dodecadenia laurel trees falls within the broad-leaved forests; mid-montane deciduous forests; and high-montane mixed stunted forests. The tree species growing to high altitude forests at 1,500–3,300 metres (4,900–10,800 ft). The upper limit of forests ranges from 3,000–3,300 m (9,800–10,800 ft).

== Description ==
They are trees evergreens, dioecious with some species growing to 15 m (49 ft) tall. The genus includes species of little trees. Dodecadenia are dioecious. Branchlets glabrous or covered with dense brown pubescence. The sheets are arranged alternate. They have mostly smooth, glossy, lauroid type leaves. Leaves alternate, pinninerved. Leaves alternate; petiole 8–10 millimetres (0.31–0.39 in), covered with pubescence; leaf blade oblong-lanceolate or oblong-oblanceolate, 5–10 × 2–3 cm, glabrous abaxially, long midrib pubescent adaxially, lateral veins 8–12 pairs, conspicuously reticulate-veined on both surfaces, base cuneate, apex acute or acuminate. Umbels solitary or clustered in axils of leaves. The inflorescences are produced in the form of umbels solitary or clustered in leaf axils. 1 to 3 umbels. Clustered in leaf axils, 1-flowered. The flowers are unisexual. Male flowers: perianth segments 6 in 2 whorls, outer ones broader, inner ones slightly narrow and pubescent outside; fertile stamens 12; filaments pubescent, of 3rd whorls each with 2 large glands at base, of 4th whorls with smaller glands; rudimentary pistil pubescent or glabrous. Female flowers: ovary pubescent or glabrous. Fruit ellipsoid, 10–12 × 7–9 mm, seated on discoid perianth tube; fruiting pedicel of 5 mm, stout. The color of the flowers is pale yellow to yellow. The flower is male or female, actinomorphic. Present Inflorescences composed of flowers, with perigonium. Female flowers: staminodes 12 in 4 whorls of 3 each, 1st and 2nd whorls eglandular, of 3rd and 4th whorls each with 2 glands at base; ovary superior; style elongated; stigma enlarge with 6 tepals. The pollination is done by bees and other insects.

They have berries named drupes. The seed is a drupe varied in size and shape from oblong to ovate or date shape. The fruit is seated on the perianth tube. Seed dispersal by vertebrate animals. The fruits are a very important food source for birds and other wildlife.

The wood is soft, light, and used for making plywood, packaging material, mechanical models, agricultural tools, etc. The branchlets and leaves may be processed for their aromatic oil and are used as material for light industry. The seeds contain fat, which is used for making soap and lubricant.

== Formerly placed here ==
- Dodecadenia paniculata Hook. f. is now considered to be a synonym of Cinnadenia paniculata (Hook.f.) Kosterm.
