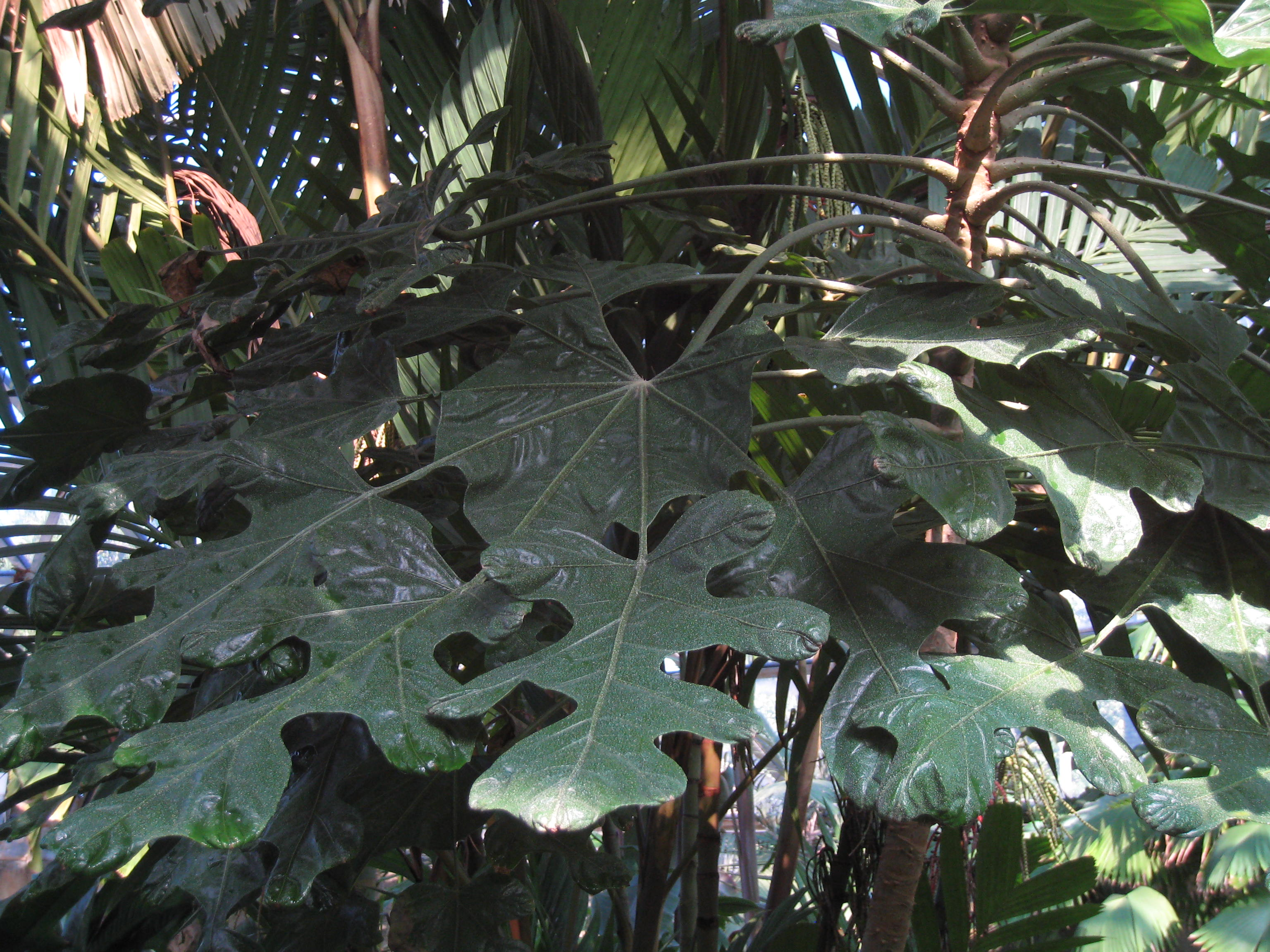
- Showing complex leaf structure

Scientific classification
- Kingdom: Plantae
- Clade: Tracheophytes
- Clade: Angiosperms
- Clade: Eudicots
- Clade: Asterids
- Order: Apiales
- Family: Araliaceae
- Genus: Trevesia
- Species: T. palmata

Binomial name
- Trevesia palmata (Roxb. ex Lindl.) Vis. 1842

= Trevesia palmata =

Species of plant

Trevesia palmata is a small tree up to 6 m (20 ft) height. It is in the family Araliaceae, and is native to Southeast Asia, from India to southern China. The common name is snowflake tree The leaves can be very unusual, sometimes with a central leaflet to which as many as nine peripheral leaflets are attached. These leaflets may be lobed to various degrees, each attached to the central leaflet by a petiolule.
