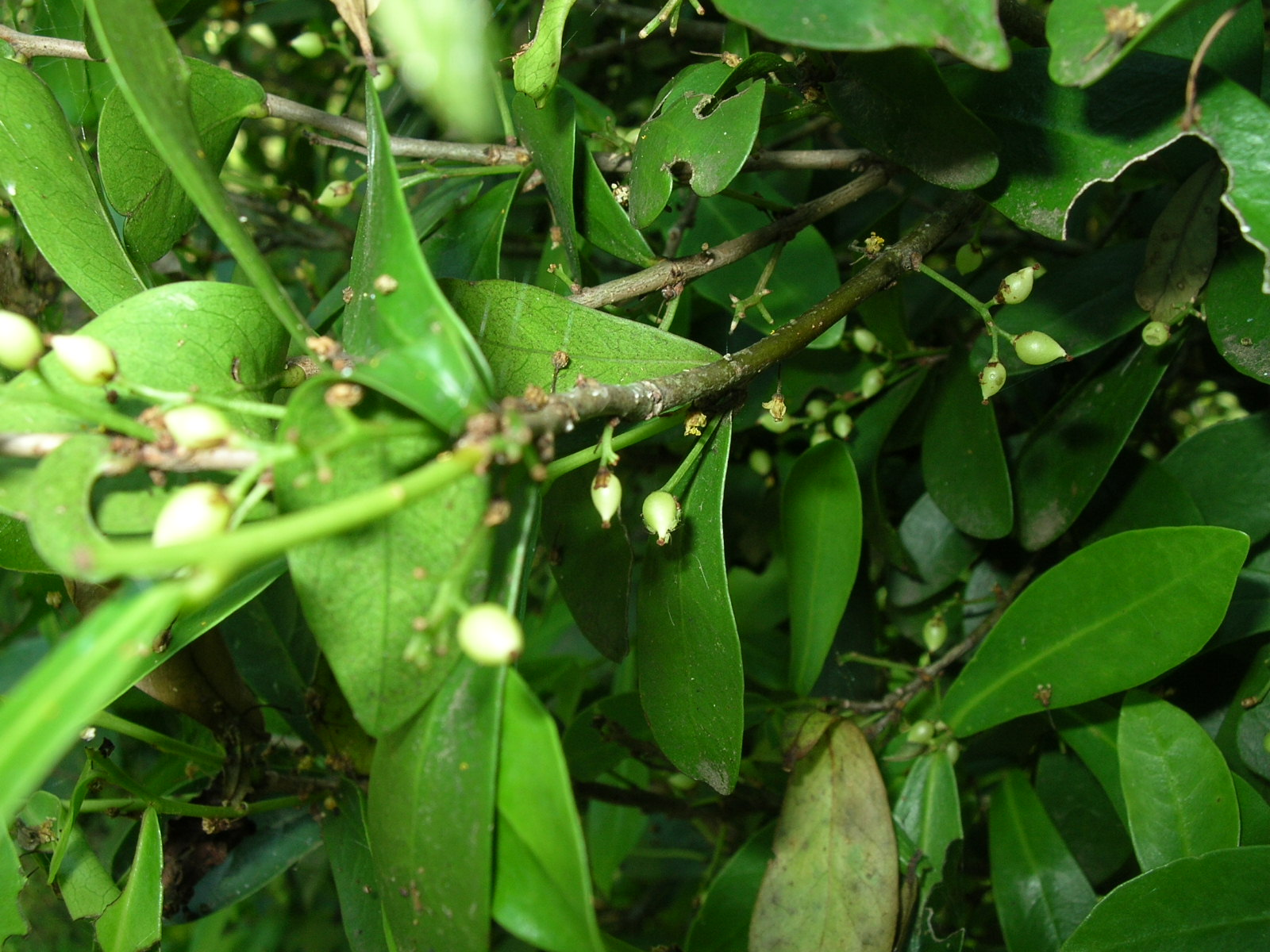
- Daphnopsis racemosa

Scientific classification
- Kingdom: Plantae
- Clade: Tracheophytes
- Clade: Angiosperms
- Clade: Eudicots
- Clade: Rosids
- Order: Malvales
- Family: Thymelaeaceae
- Subfamily: Thymelaeoideae
- Genus: Daphnopsis; Mart. (1824)

Type species
- Daphnopsis brasiliensis Mart.

Synonyms
- Bosca Vell. (1829); Coleophora Miers (1851); Hargasseria C.A.Mey. (1843); Hyptiodaphne Urb. (1901); Nordmannia Fisch. & C.A.Mey. (1843)

= Daphnopsis =

Genus of flowering plants

Daphnopsis is a plant genus in the family Thymelaeaceae. It includes 72 species native to the Neotropics. They are shrubs and small trees with tubular or bell-shaped flowers. Individuals are dioecious, with male and female flowers produced on separate trees.

== Species ==
72 species are accepted.

- Daphnopsis alainii Nevling
- Daphnopsis alpestris (Gardner) Benth. & Hook.f. ex B.D.Jacks.
- Daphnopsis americana (Mill.) J.R.Johnst.
- Daphnopsis angustifolia C.Wright ex Griseb.
- Daphnopsis anomala (Kunth) Domke
- Daphnopsis bissei A.Noa Monzón
- Daphnopsis boliviana Nevling
- Daphnopsis brasiliensis Mart. & Zucc.
- Daphnopsis brevifolia Nevling
- Daphnopsis calcicola Ekman ex Urb.
- Daphnopsis caracasana Meisn.
- Daphnopsis cestrifolia (Kunth) Meisn.
- Daphnopsis coriacea Taub.
- Daphnopsis correae Barringer & Nevling
- Daphnopsis costaricensis Barringer & Grayum
- Daphnopsis crassifolia (Poir.) Meisn.
- Daphnopsis crispotomentosa Cuatrec.
- Daphnopsis cuneata Radlk.
- Daphnopsis dircoides Steyerm.
- Daphnopsis ekmanii Domke
- Daphnopsis equatorialis Nevling
- Daphnopsis espinosae Monach.
- Daphnopsis fasciculata (Meisn.) Nevling
- Daphnopsis ficina Standl. & Steyerm.
- Daphnopsis filipedunculata Nevling & Barringer
- Daphnopsis flavida Lundell
- Daphnopsis folsomii Barringer & Nevling
- Daphnopsis gemmiflora (Miers) Domke
- Daphnopsis grandis Nevling & Barringer
- Daphnopsis granitica Pruski & Barringer
- Daphnopsis granvillei Barringer
- Daphnopsis guacacoa C.Wright ex Griseb.
- Daphnopsis guaiquinimae Steyerm.
- Daphnopsis hammelii Barringer & Nevling
- Daphnopsis helleriana Urb.
- Daphnopsis hispaniolica Nevling
- Daphnopsis lagunae Breedlove & León de la Luz
- Daphnopsis liebmannii Nevling
- Daphnopsis longipedunculata Gilg ex Domke
- Daphnopsis macrocarpa Nevling
- Daphnopsis macrophylla (Kunth) Gilg
- Daphnopsis malacophylla Standl. & Steyerm.
- Daphnopsis martii Meisn.
- Daphnopsis megacarpa Nevling & Barringer
- Daphnopsis mexiae Nevling
- Daphnopsis mollis (Meisn.) Standl.
- Daphnopsis monocephala Donn.Sm.
- Daphnopsis morii Barringer & Nevling
- Daphnopsis nevlingiana Steyerm.
- Daphnopsis nevlingii J.Jiménez Ram.
- Daphnopsis oblongifolia Britton & P.Wilson
- Daphnopsis occidentalis (Sw.) Krug & Urb.
- Daphnopsis occulta Nevling
- Daphnopsis pavonii Meisn.
- Daphnopsis perplexa Nevling
- Daphnopsis peruviensis (Domke) J.F.Macbr.
- Daphnopsis philippiana Krug & Urb.
- Daphnopsis pseudosalix Domke
- Daphnopsis punctulata Urb.
- Daphnopsis purdiei Meisn.
- Daphnopsis purpusii Brandegee
- Daphnopsis racemosa Griseb.
- Daphnopsis radiata Donn.Sm.
- Daphnopsis sanctae-teresae Nevling
- Daphnopsis schwackeana Taub.
- Daphnopsis selerorum Gilg
- Daphnopsis sellowiana Taub.
- Daphnopsis steyermarkii Nevling
- Daphnopsis strigillosa Lundell
- Daphnopsis tuerckheimiana Donn.Sm.
- Daphnopsis utilis Warm.
- Daphnopsis weberbaueri Domke
- Daphnopsis witsbergeri Nevling, Matek.is & Barringer
- Daphnopsis zamorensis Domke
