= Daphnopsis folsomii =

Scientific classification
- Kingdom: Plantae
- Clade: Embryophytes
- Clade: Tracheophytes
- Clade: Spermatophytes
- Clade: Angiosperms
- Clade: Eudicots
- Clade: Rosids
- Order: Malvales
- Family: Thymelaeaceae
- Genus: Daphnopsis
- Species: D. folsomii

Binomial name
- Daphnopsis folsomii Barringer & Nevling

Species of flowering plant

Daphnopsis folsomii is a plant species native to Panama. It has been found in two different regions: the Darién Province in eastern Panama and the Coclé Province in the central part of the country.

Daphnopsis folsomii is a shrub up to 2 m tall. Leaf blades are thick and leathery, up to 25 cm long, green on the upper side, slightly lighter green below. Pistillate (female) flowers are grouped together into a head of 10-15 flowers. Fruits are white, egg-shaped, up to 20 mm long.
