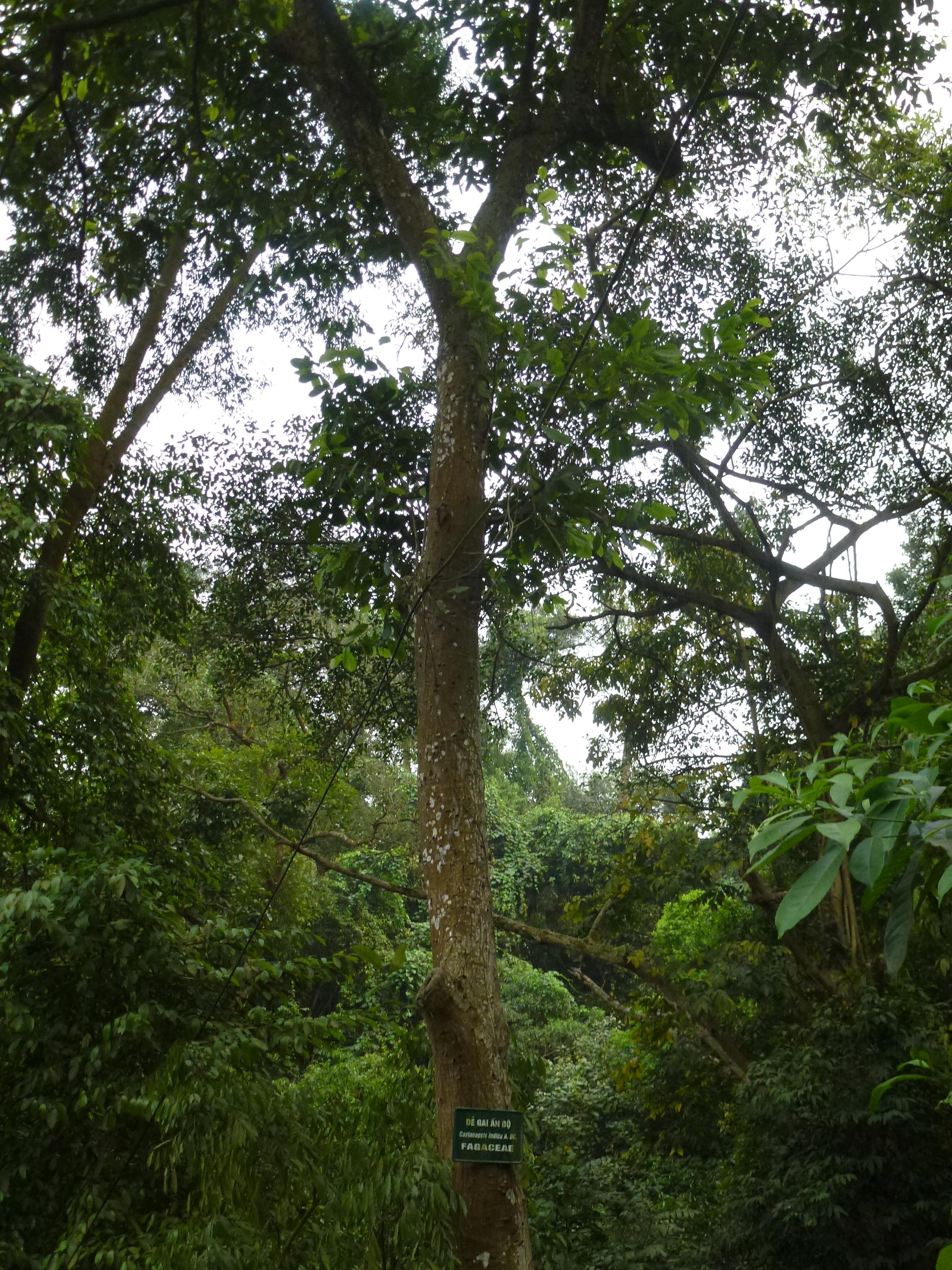

Conservation status
- Least Concern (IUCN 3.1)

Scientific classification
- Kingdom: Plantae
- Clade: Tracheophytes
- Clade: Angiosperms
- Clade: Eudicots
- Clade: Rosids
- Order: Fagales
- Family: Fagaceae
- Genus: Castanopsis
- Species: C. indica

Binomial name
- Castanopsis indica (Roxb. ex Lindl.) A.DC.

Synonyms
- Castanea indica Roxburgh ex Lindl.; Castanopsis macrostachya Hu; Castanopsis sinensis A. Chev.; Castanopsis subacuminata Hayata; Quercus acutissima (Endl.) A. Camus; Quercus dubia Lindl. ex Wall.; Quercus indica Drake; Quercus prinodes Voigt; Quercus prinoides Willd.; Quercus roxburghii Endl.; Quercus serrata Roxb.

= Castanopsis indica =

Species of tree

Castanopsis indica is a tree in the family Fagaceae.

== Description ==
Castanopsis indica is a tallish tree, growing up around 8–14 m (26–46 ft) in height with a dense, full crown. The leaves are thick and leathery with a serrated edge. They are oblong and elliptical, with an acute tip, are nearly evergreen and have a short petiole. The bark of the tree is rough and grey. The fruit is reddish-brown and round, found in small clusters, and is covered with long, thin spines. The fruit is often fed upon by squirrels.

The tree can be found between 300–1,000 m (980–3,280 ft) above sea level.

== Distribution and habitat ==
Castanopsis indica grows naturally in Nepal, Bhutan to Taiwan.

== Uses ==
The nuts of the tree are considered edible. The wood is locally used in construction and the bark can be used in tanning. In Nepal the leaves are used to wrap things.
