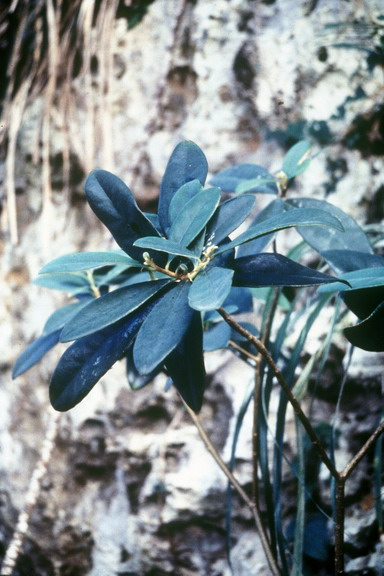

Conservation status
- Endangered (ESA)

Scientific classification
- Kingdom: Plantae
- Clade: Tracheophytes
- Clade: Angiosperms
- Clade: Eudicots
- Clade: Rosids
- Order: Malvales
- Family: Thymelaeaceae
- Genus: Daphnopsis
- Species: D. helleriana

Binomial name
- Daphnopsis helleriana Urb. (1901)

= Daphnopsis helleriana =

Species of flowering plant

Daphnopsis helleriana is a rare species of flowering plant in the genus Daphnopsis of the family Thymelaeaceae. It is endemic to Puerto Rico, where there were only four populations remaining in 1992, with a total of 125 individuals. It was federally listed as an endangered species of the United States in 1988.

This is a shrub or evergreen tree which is limited to limestone substrates on the island of Puerto Rico. It grows in moist forest habitat among almacigo (Bursera simaruba), copey (Clusia rosea), holywood (Guaiacum sanctum), pigeonplum (Coccoloba diversifolia), and other plants.

This shrub or tree grows to 6 meters in maximum height. The leaves have oval blades up to 13 centimeters long by 6 wide. New leaves are golden in color. Mature leaves are green and hairless on the upper surface, drying to reddish brown. The plant is dioecious with male and female flowers occurring on separate plants. Male plants have small, hairy, tubular flowers under a centimeter long. The female plants bear smaller, hairy, bell-shaped flowers under half a centimeter long. Flowering occurs in February through April. The fruit is a white berry under two centimeters in length and containing one seed. The plants in two of the populations yield many seedlings, but the other two sites have few, suggesting the sex ratio there may be skewed toward one sex or the other.

The plant was first discovered in 1900 but not recorded again until 1958. Three of the four populations are in Toa Baja, and the fourth is in Isabela. It has probably always been quite rare, but the remaining plants face threats. Deforestation has limited the amount of remaining habitat for this and other endemics, such as Cornutia obovata. Forests have been cleared for agriculture, including grazing operations and yam farms, and the trees are consumed for construction wood and for charcoal. The quarrying of limestone in the hills where the plant occurs threatens the ecosystem.
