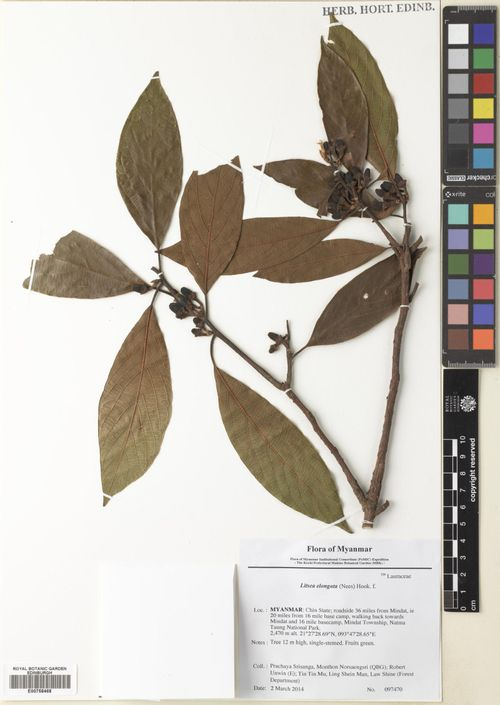

Conservation status
- Least Concern (IUCN 3.1)

Scientific classification
- Kingdom: Plantae
- Clade: Embryophytes
- Clade: Tracheophytes
- Clade: Spermatophytes
- Clade: Angiosperms
- Clade: Magnoliids
- Order: Laurales
- Family: Lauraceae
- Genus: Litsea
- Species: L. elongata

Binomial name
- Litsea elongata (Nees) Hook.f.

Synonyms
- Daphnidium elongatum Nees; Malapoenna elongata (Nees) Kuntze; Tetranthera elongata (Nees) Hook.f. & Thomson ex Meisn.

= Litsea elongata =

Species of plant

Litsea elongata is a species of plant in the family Lauraceae. It was described in 1886 by Christian Gottfried Daniel Nees von Esenbeck.

== Distribution ==
It is native to the wet tropical biome of India (Assam), China (including Hainan), Myanmar, Nepal, Tibet, and Vietnam. It grows in forests and along roadsides, at altitudes of 500–2,500 metres (1,600–8,200 ft). The species sometimes grows on limestone.

== Description ==
Litsea elongata is an evergreen tree that can grow to be up to 12 feet, or 3.6 metres tall.

== Varieties ==
Litsea elongata contains the following varieties:

- Litsea elongata var. cuneifolia H.Liu
- Litsea elongata var. elongata
- Litsea elongata var. faberi (Hemsl.) Yen C.Yang & P.H.Huang
- Litsea elongata var. latifolia A.M.Cowan & Cowan
- Litsea elongata var. subverticillata (Y.C.Yang) Yen C.Yang & P.H.Huang

== Uses ==
The wood and seed oil of the species are used.
