= Roberto de Visiani =

Dalmatian Italian botanist

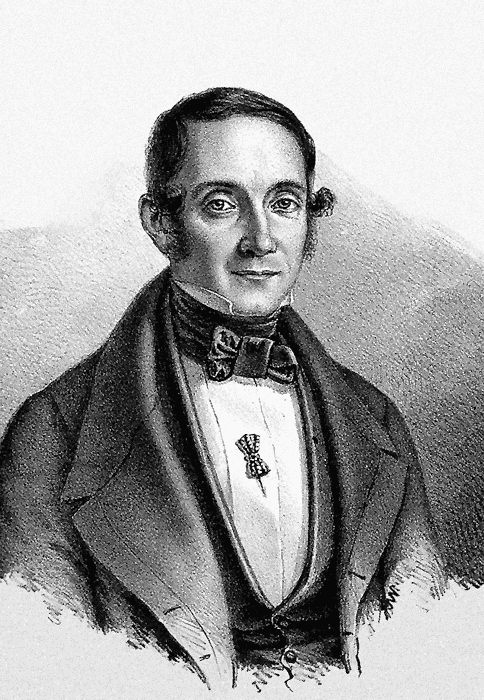
- Roberto de Visiani. Lithograph by A. Rochini.
- Born: 9 April 1800; Šibenik, Dalmatia
- Died: 4 May 1878 (aged 78); Padua
- Scientific career
- Fields: Botany
- Author abbrev. (botany): Vis.

Roberto de Visiani (1800–1878) (in Croatian: Robert Visiani) was a Dalmatian Italian botanist, naturalist and scholar. He is seen as one of the fathers of modern botany in Italy.

The standard author abbreviation Vis. is used to indicate this person as the author when citing a botanical name.

== Early career ==
He was the son of a physician and a close friend of his fellow citizen Niccolò Tommaseo. After finishing his studies in his hometown and the seminary in Split, he entered in 1817 the University of Padua, from which he graduated in Medicine in 1822.

Since he was a boy he had various interests, from literature to science, but his predilection went immediately to botany, at the time considered a branch of medicine: in Padua his interest focused on the local botanical garden, to which he devoted himself as a student.

After serving as a university assistant, he returned to Dalmatia in 1827 to work as a doctor (in Šibenik, Drniš, Kotor and Budva). At the same time, he maintained a correspondence with his Paduan master, professor Giuseppe Antonio Bonato who during the same years tried to establish the autonomous teaching of botany in the Paduan university.

De Visiani wrote of some plants to the director of the "Gazzetta Botanica" ("Botanische Zeitung") of Regensburg, and shortly thereafter he was invited to collaborate with the magazine. Between 1828 and 1830 he published the classification and description of over fifty species discovered by him.

== Works available online ==
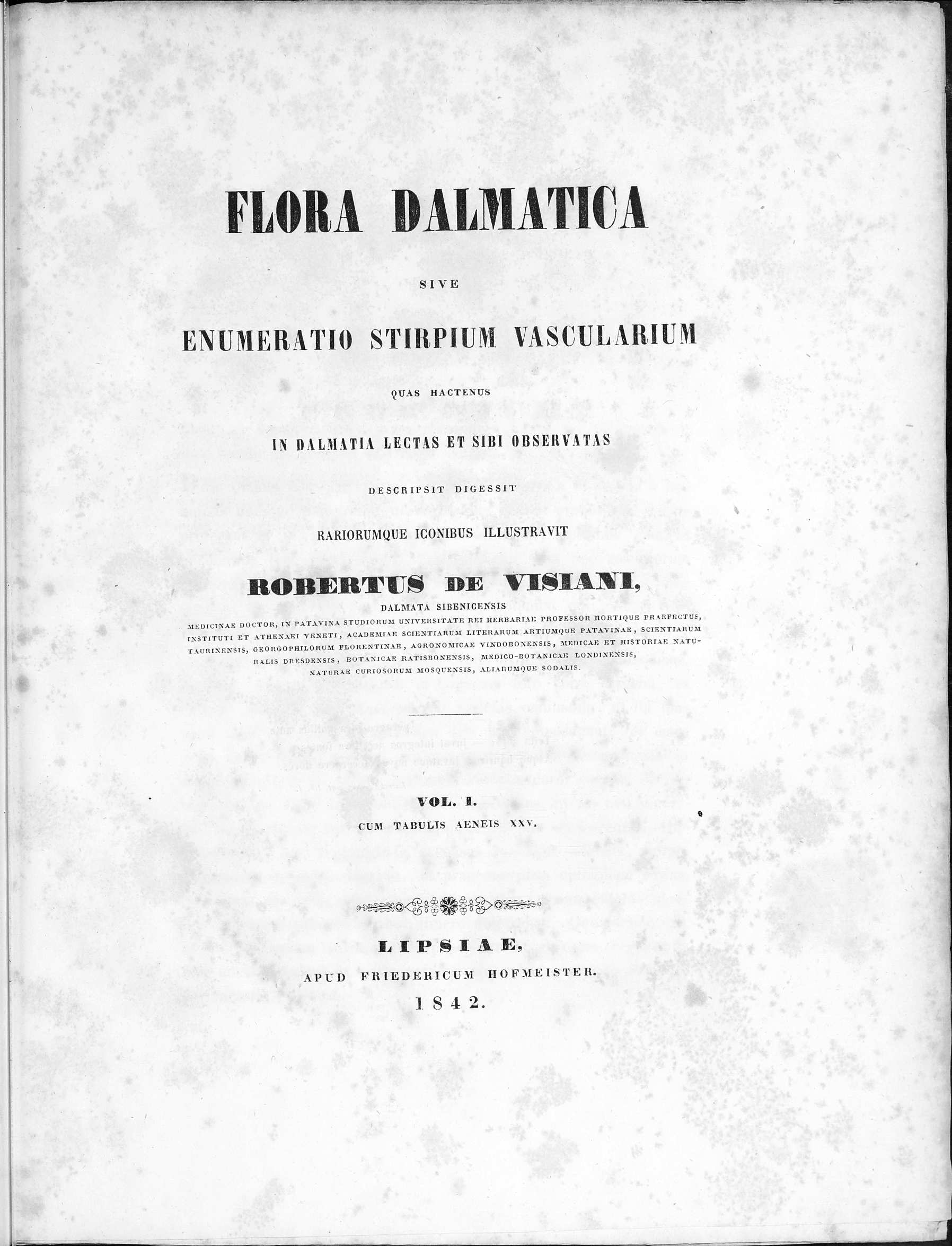
Flora dalmatica, 1842

- Visiani, Roberto De (1839). Della origine ed anzianità dell'Orto botanico di Padova (in Italian). Venezia.
- Visiani, Roberto De (1840). Illustrazione delle piante nuove o rare dell'Orto botanico di Padova (in Italian). Padova.
- Visiani, Roberto De (1842). L'Orto botanico di Padova nell'anno MDCCCXLII (in Italian). Padova.
- Flora dalmatica (in Latin). Vol. 1. Leipzig: Hofmeister. 1842.
  - Flora dalmatica (in Latin). Vol. 2. Leipzig: Hofmeister. 1847.
  - Flora dalmatica (in Latin). Vol. 3. Leipzig: Hofmeister. 1852.
- Flora dalmatica. Supplementum (in Latin). Vol. 1. Padova. 1876.
  - Flora dalmatica. Supplementum (in Latin). Vol. 2. 1881.
