= Jiangxinpo =

Qing-ruled area in modern Myanmar

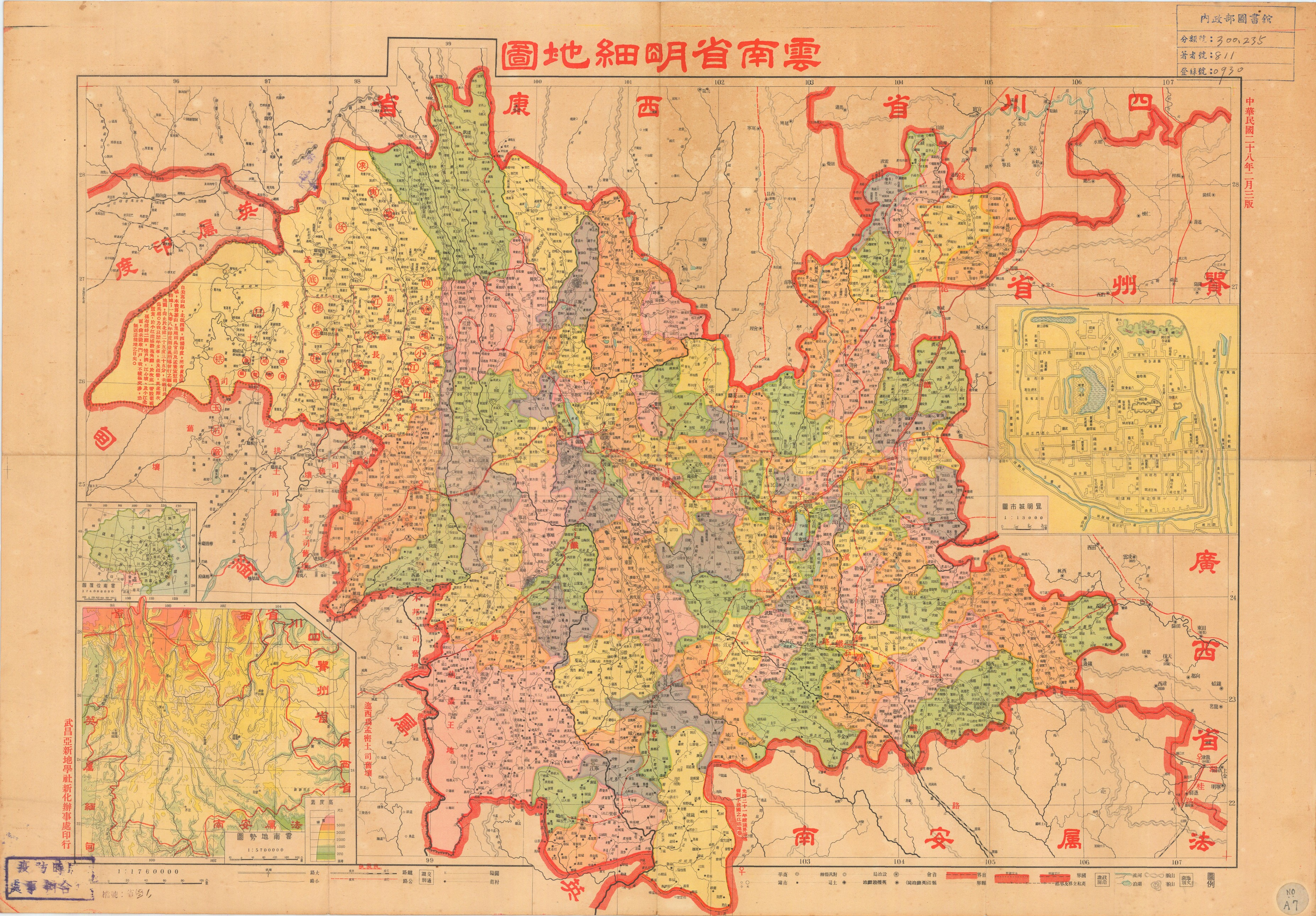
1939 map of Yunnan during the ROC era showing Jiangxinpo (shown top left, yellow), Namwan (shown at center left, orange and protruding), and Kokang (shown bottom left, red)

1979 ROC map showing the claims of the ROC, including Jiangxinpo and Namwan

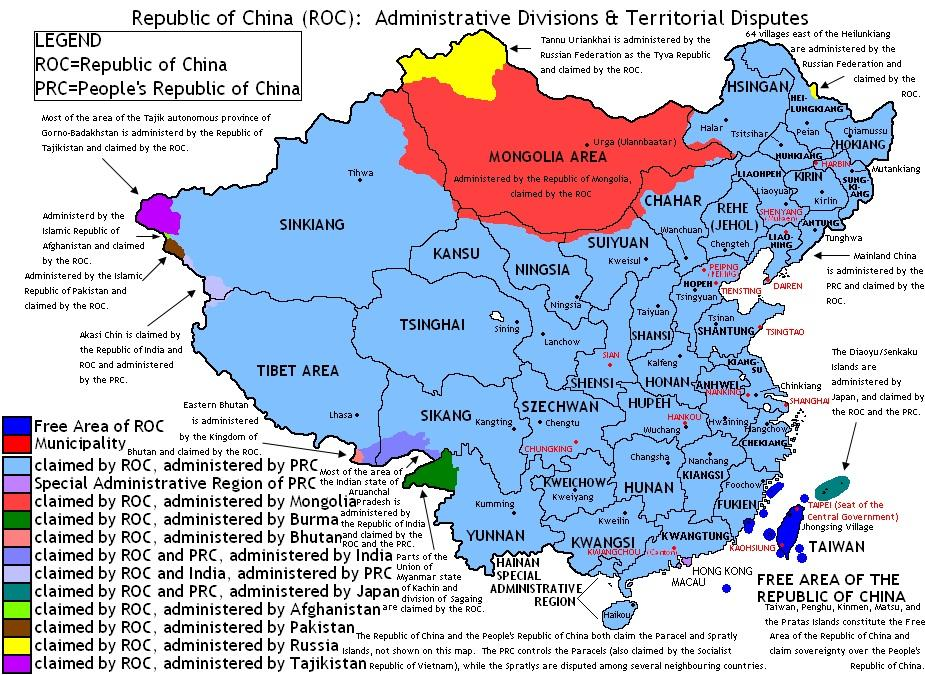
Map showing the claims of the ROC, including Jiangxinpo and Namwan

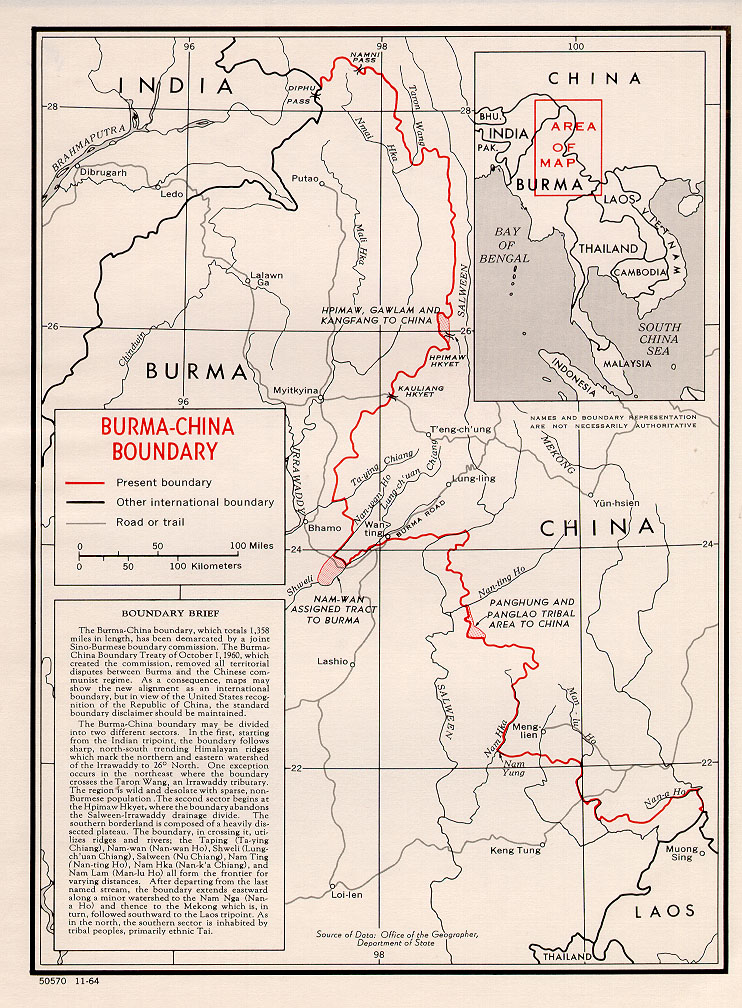
Map showing the small portion of disputed areas ceded from Burma to China, including Hpimaw, Gawlam & Kangfang

Jiangxinpo (Chinese: 江心坡) was an area in Kachin State, Myanmar, located between the N'Mai and Mali Rivers, west of the Gaoligong Mountains of Yunnan, China. It was previously under the rule of the Qing dynasty of China.

In 1910, a year before the Republic of China (ROC) was established, the British occupied Hpimaw (片馬/片马; Piànmǎ) in the Pianma Incident, as well as a part of what is now Northern Kachin state in 1926–27 and part of the Wa states in 1940.

It was disputed territory between China and Myanmar until 1961, when the People's Republic of China (PRC) recognized Myanmar's sovereignty over it, with the exception of Burma relinquishing small amount of that territory, namely Hpimaw (Pianma) and adjacent Gawlam (Gulang) (古浪; Gǔlàng) and Kangfang (崗房; 岗房; Gǎngfáng) to the PRC, as part of Lushui county. Some Chinese commentators, especially those on ROC's media, as well as those overseas, criticised the PRC government for signing the agreement, which they regarded as guaranteeing the permanent loss of former Chinese territory to Myanmar.

== See also ==
- Kachin Hills
- Pianma Incident
- Sino–Burmese 1960 border treaty
- Putao (葡萄) (ပူတာအို)
- Hukawng Valley (胡康/胡岡) (ဟူးကောင်းချိုင့်ဝှမ်း)
- Namkham (南坎) (နမ့်ခမ်းမြို့)
- Former Yunnan Province, Republic of China
