= Fort Hertz =

British outpost in northern Burma

Coordinates: 27°21′00″N 97°24′00″E

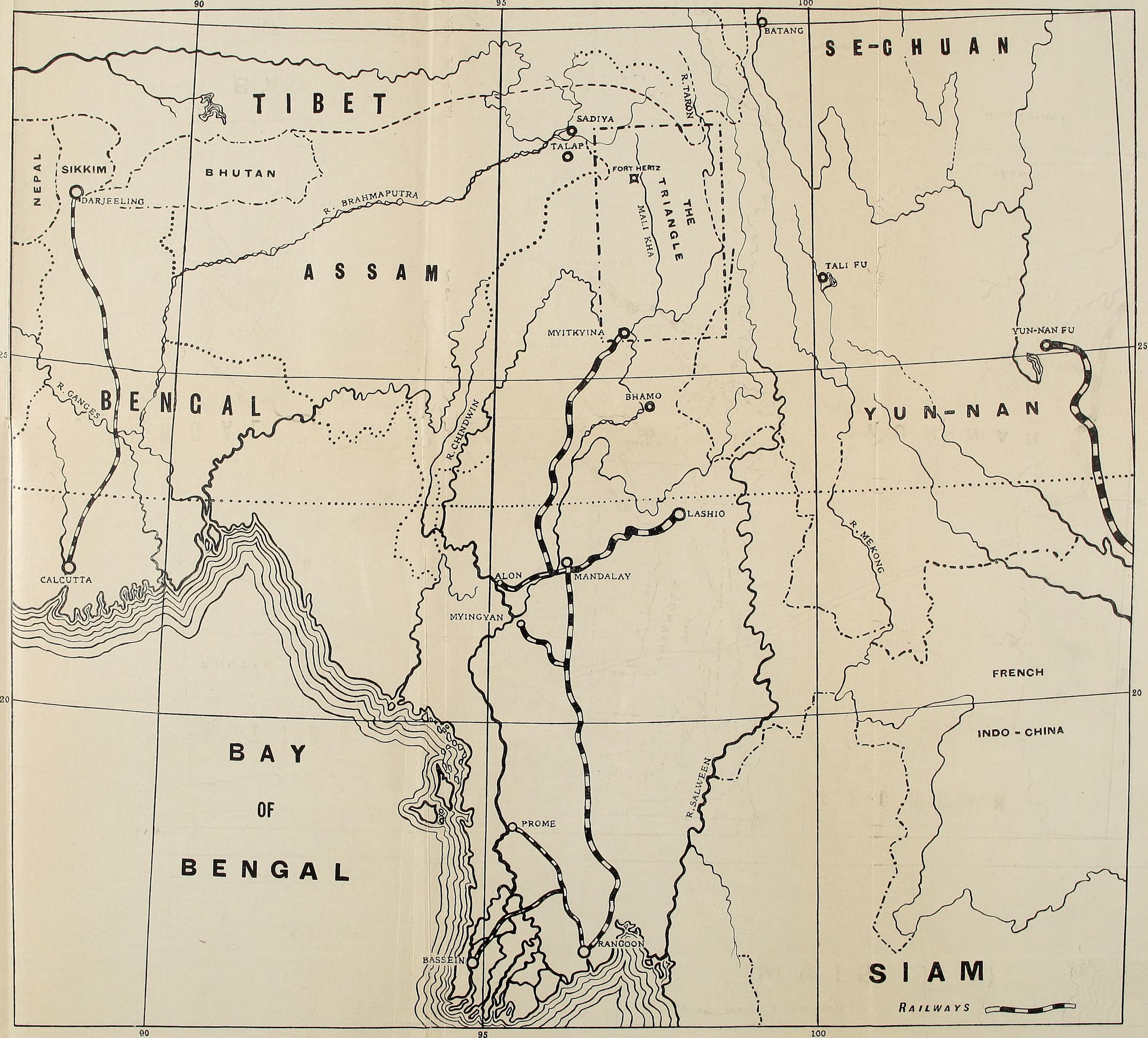
1921 map from "In farthest Burma - the record of an arduous journey of exploration and research through the unknown frontier territory of Burma and Tibet"

Fort Hertz was a remote British military outpost in northeastern Burma in the district of Putao in what is now the Kachin State near the present town of Putao. It was named after William Axel Hertz. Hertz led the first expeditions into the far north of Burma in 1888, was responsible for the 1912 Gazetteer of Kachin Hills area and served as the first Deputy Commissioner of the Government in the Putao District. The military post was established in 1914 and named Fort Hertz in 1925 on the retirement of William Hertz from the Indian Civil Service.

== World War II ==
Up until 1942, Fort Hertz was maintained as an outpost of the Myitkyina Battalion of the Burma Frontier Force. During the 1942 Japanese invasion of Burma, various retreating soldiers of the British/Indian Burma Garrison remained in the Fort Hertz area. The military authorities in India had no direct contact with Fort Hertz during most of the summer of 1942.

Troops were parachuted into Upper Burma on 3 July 1942. Led by Captain J.O.M. Roberts of the 153rd (Gurkha) Indian Parachute Battalion, the men had orders to investigate the state of the Myitkyina area and then march 150 miles north to Fort Hertz.

On 12 August 1942, Major Hopkins of the 50th Indian Parachute Brigade overflew the Fort and discovered that it was unexpectedly in British hands. Captain Roberts had reached the fort some days before. The landing strip at the fort was however unusable. The next day, a party led by Captain G.E.C. Newland of the 153rd Indian Parachute Battalion parachuted into Fort Hertz with engineering supplies. By 20 August, the airfield had been repaired enough that aircraft could land. Lieutenant-Colonel Gamble, the new commander of the area, arrived on that date, quickly followed by a company of the 7/9th Jat Regiment. The party led by Captain Roberts was extracted around the same time together with troops withdrawing from the Japanese advance into Burma, among others Captain Arthur Leonard Bell Thompson, later to be known under his pen name Francis Clifford.

Its garrison, consisting of various battalions of the British Indian Army and the Northern Kachin Levies, formed an isolated Northern post of the Allied Armies engaged in the Burma Campaign. With the assistance of Kachin irregulars, the route north from Japanese-held Burma to Fort Hertz was defended against a series of minor attacks in 1942 and 1943.

In 1943 and 1944 the primary purpose of Fort Hertz was to gather intelligence and to cover an airstrip which served as an emergency landing ground for planes flying The Hump from India to China over the eastern end of the Himalayas. This same airstrip was the only supply line for Fort Hertz. There was also eventually a radio beacon navigation check point at the site.

Large-scale official training of the Kachin Levies did not start until August 1943 when a V Force team was sent to Fort Hertz. An American advisory team of eight officers and 40 sergeants (radiomen, cryptographers and medics) also flew into Fort Hertz. The American forces raised their own Kachin force in a Myitkyina area in 1944 which were known as the Kachin Rangers.

When General Joseph Stilwell's Chinese X Force started the advance to cover the building of the Ledo Road and American Northern Combat Area Command operation, forces from Fort Hertz advanced on Stilwell's left flank and captured Sumprabum. They then continued their advance towards Myitkyina capturing Tiangup and eventually linking up with X Force.

The operational forces at Fort Hertz were maintained solely by air for around 25 months, from August 1942 to August 1944.

== See also ==
- OSS Detachment 101
