= Machanbaw =

Machanbaw မချမ်းဘောမြို့
- Location in Burma
- Coordinates: 27°17′02″N 97°35′21″E
- Country: Myanmar
- Division: Kachin State
- District: Putao District
- Township: Machanbaw Township

Population (2005)
  - Religions: Buddhism
- Time zone: UTC+6.30 (MST)

Machanbaw (Burmese: မချမ်းဘောမြို့) is a town in the Kachin State of northernmost part of the Myanmar. It is on the Namtiyu River. The placename means "confluence of the Machan River" in Jingpo.
