= Kawnglanghpu =

Kawnglanghpu ခေါင်လန်ဖူးမြို့နယ် Khaunglanhpu
- Location in Burma
- Coordinates: 27°03′37″N 98°21′37″E
- Country: Myanmar
- Division: Kachin State
- District: Putao District
- Township: Kawnglanghpu Township

Population
  - Total: 450
- Time zone: UTC+6.30 (MST)

Kawnglanghpu (Burmese: ခေါင်လန်ဖူးမြို့နယ်) is the third smallest town in Kachin State, Myanmar after Hsawlaw and Injangyang. It is also the eighth smallest municipality in the whole country. The placename is derived from the Rawang language words meaning "Kawnglang's village".

The English botanist and plant collector Reginald Farrer was buried in the town in 1920.

== Geography ==
Kawnglangphu is located in far-north of Burma, Kachin State. The town population is 450 and surrounded by snow-capped mountains of Kachin State.
