= Mulashidi =

Village in Kachin State, Myanmar

Mulashidi မူလာရှီးဒီ
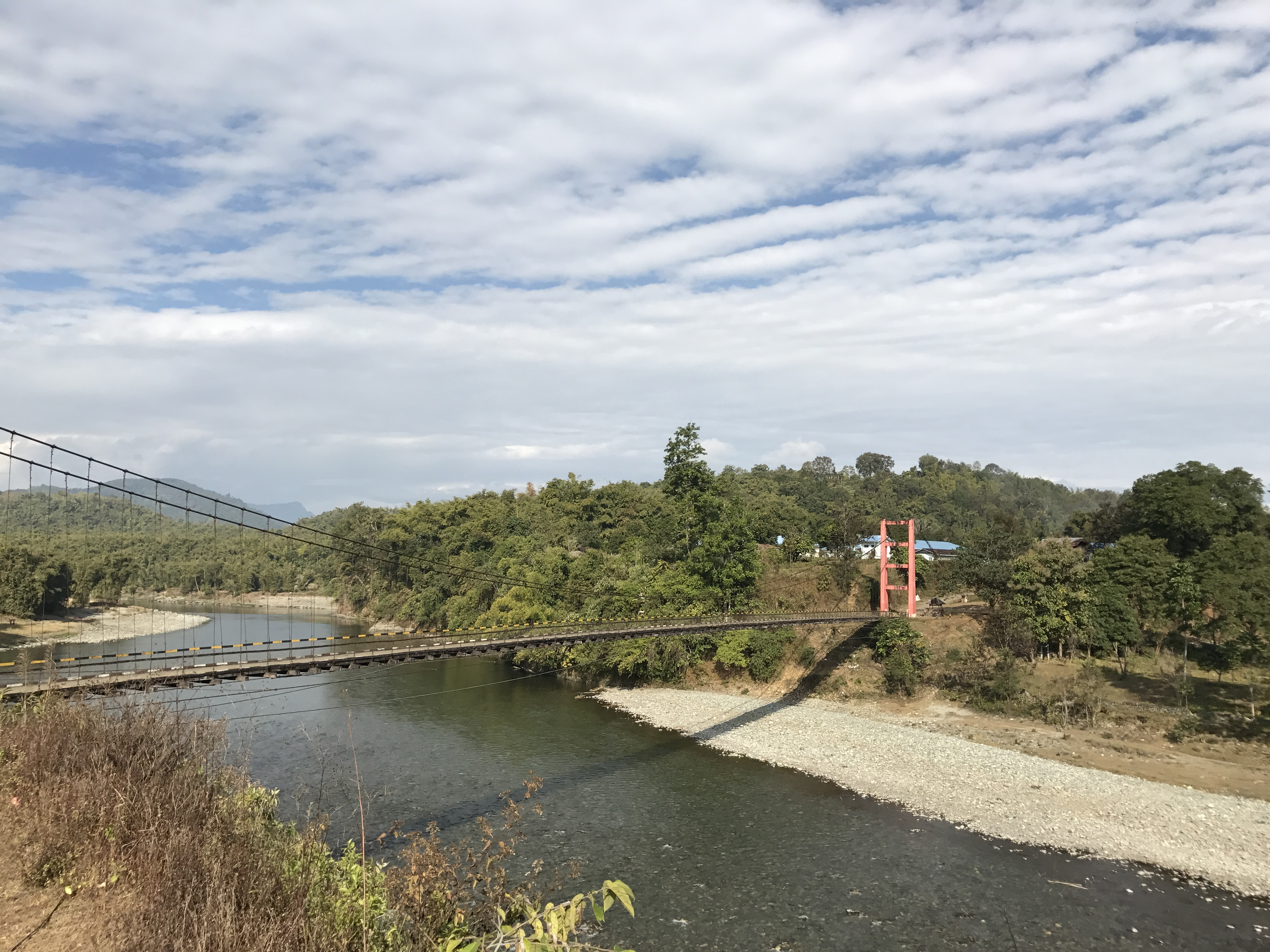
- A bridge in Mulashidi

- Location in Burma
- Coordinates: 27°15′19″N 97°25′51″E
- Country: Myanmar
- Division: Kachin State
- District: Putao District
- Township: Putao Township

Population (2005)
  - Religions: Buddhism
- Time zone: UTC+6.30 (MST)

Mulashidi is a town in Putao Township in Kachin State, in far-northern Myanmar. The Nam Lang River flows through Mulashidi.

== History ==
During the Chinese Civil War, Mao's advances prompted an American missionary, J. Russell Morse, to flee from Yunnan Province to Myanmar, which was then a British colony. He founded a Church of Christ mission at Mulashidi with several thousand parishioners.

== Points of interest ==
Mulashidi is home to the Malikha Lodge, a luxury resort designed by Belgian architect Jean-Michel Gathy. The ruins of Morse's mission can still be visited as well.
