= Kachin Hills =

Highlands in Myanmar

- Location within Myanmar

Highest point
- Peak: Bumhpa Bum
- Elevation: 3,411 m (11,191 ft)
- Coordinates: 26°41′N 97°14′E

Geography
- Country: Burma
- Region: Southeast Asia
- Borders on: Burma, Arunachal Pradesh (India), Tibet and Yunnan (China)

Geology
- Rock type(s): Granite, limestone

The Kachin Hills are a heavily forested group of highlands in the extreme northeastern area of the Kachin State of Burma. They consist of a series of ranges running mostly in a N/S direction, including the Kumon Bum subrange of which the highest peak is Bumhpa Bum with an elevation of 3,411 metres (11,191 ft) one of the ultra-prominent peaks of Southeast Asia. The Kachin Hills are inhabited by the Kachin people.

== Geography ==
The country within the Kachin Hill tracts is roughly estimated at 19,177 square miles (49,670 km^{2}), and consists of a series of ranges, for the most part running north and south, and intersected by valleys, all leading towards the Irrawaddy River, which drains the whole country.

== British administration ==
According to the Kachin Hill Tribes Regulation of 1895, administrative responsibility was accepted by the British government on the left bank of the Irrawaddy for the country south of the Nmaikha, and on the right bank for the country south of a line drawn from the confluence of the Malikha and Nmaikha through the northern limit of the Laban district and including the jade mines. The tribes north of this line were told that if they abstained from raiding to the south of it they would not be interfered with. South of that line peace was to be enforced and a small tribute taken, with a minimum of interference in their private affairs.

On the British side of the border, the chief objects of Britain's colonial policy were the disarmament of the tribes and construction of frontier and internal roads. A small tribute was taken by the British. The Kachins were subject to many British "police operations" and two fighting expeditions:

=== British incursion of 1892-93 ===
The city of Bhamo was occupied by the British on December 28, 1885, and almost immediately, trouble began. Constant punitive measures were carried out by the military police; but in December 1892, a police column proceeding to establish a post at Sima was heavily attacked, and simultaneously the town of Myitkyina was raided by Kachin fighters. A force of 1,200 troops was sent to put down the rebellion. The Kachin fighters received their final blow at Palap, but not before three British officers were killed, three wounded and 102 sepoys and followers killed and wounded.

=== British incursion of 1895-96 ===
The continued "misconduct" of the Sana Kachins from beyond the administrative border rendered punitive measures necessary, in the eyes of British colonists. No retaliation had taken place since the attack on Myitkyina in December 1892. Now two columns were sent up, one of 250 rifles from Myitkyina, the other of 200 rifles from Mogaung, marching in December 1895. The resistance was insignificant, and the fighting resulted in a complete victory for the British. A strong force of military police was stationed at Myitkyina, with several outposts in the Kachin hills.

=== Pianma Incident ===
In 1910, during the very last year of Qing Empire, the British occupied Hpimaw (Pianma) in the Pianma Incident, as well as a part of what is now Northern Kachin state in 1926-27 and part of the Wa states in 1940.

== Independent Burma ==
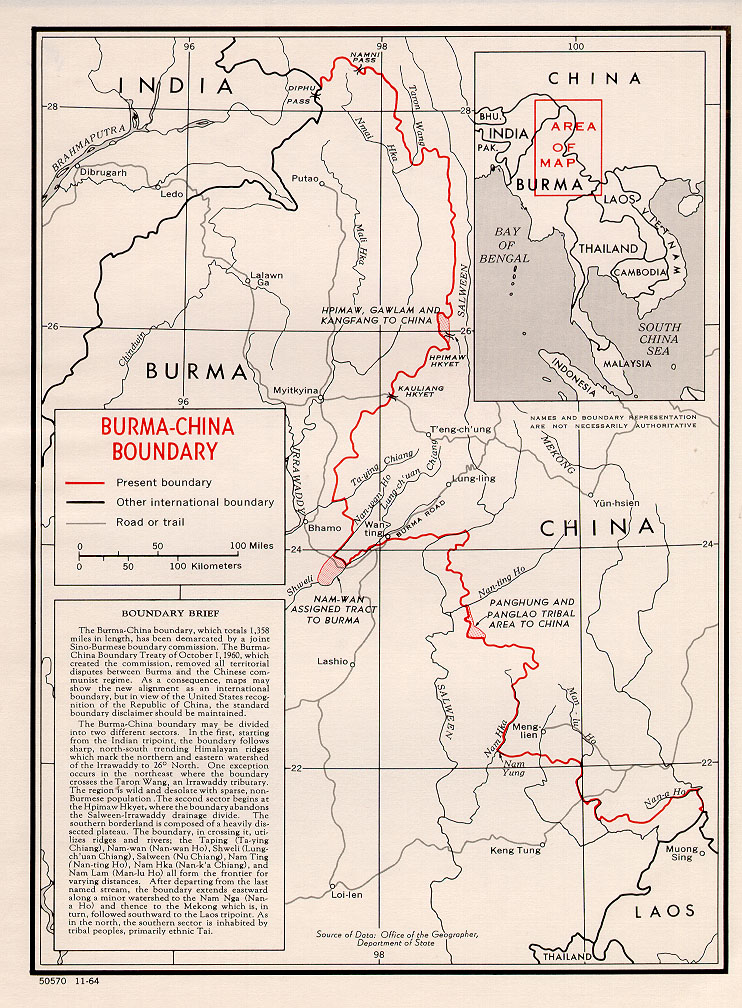
Map showing the areas ceded from Burma to China, including Hpimaw, Gawlam & Kangfang

Myanmar relinquished the eastern villages of Hpimaw (Pianma) and adjacent Gawlam (Gulang) and Kangfang (Gangfang) to the People's Republic of China (PRC) in 1960, ending the political boundary dispute. Although Kachin Hills had been granted much autonomy under the 1947 constitution, the Myanmar government has since integrated it into the rest of the country, but not without the resistance of groups such as the Kachin Independence Organisation, which has fought the government since 1961.

== See also ==
- Jiangxinpo
- List of Ultras of Southeast Asia
- Hukawng Valley
- Putao
- Sino–Burmese 1960 border treaty
