= Sumprabum =

Sumprabum ဆွမ်ပရာဘွမ်မြို့
- Location in Burma
- Coordinates: 26°33′0″N 97°34′0″E
- Country: Myanmar
- Division: Kachin State
- District: Putao District
- Township: Sumprabum Township

Population (2005)
  - Religions: Christian
- Time zone: UTC+6.30 (MST)

Sumprabum (Burmese: ဆွမ်ပရာဘွမ်မြို့) is a town in the Kachin State of the northernmost part of the Myanmar. The placename means "jungle grass mountain" in Jingpo.

== Recent history ==
In 2024, the Kachin Independence Army (KIA) captured the town from the Tatmadaw during the civil war. KIA troops had been in the town since late March but overran the 46th Infantry Battalion base on 5 May 2024.

== Climate ==
Sumprabum has a humid subtropical climate (Köppen climate classification Cwa), closely bordering on a subtropical highland climate (Cwb).
