= Sumprabum Township =

Coordinates: 26.5500°N 97.5667°E

Sumprabum Township ဆွမ်ပရာဘွမ်မြို့နယ်
- Township
- Location in PutaO district
- Country: Burma
- State: Kachin State
- District: Putao District
- Time zone: UTC+6:30 (MST)

Sumprabum Township (Burmese: ဆွမ်ပရာဘွမ်မြို့နယ်) is a township of Putao District in the Kachin State of Burma. The principal town is Sumprabum.

== Population ==
As of census 2014, Sumprabum has a population of 2,546.
