= Bumhpa Bum =

Mountain in Myanmar

- Location within Myanmar

Highest point
- Elevation: 3,411 m (11,191 ft)
- Prominence: 1,636 m (5,367 ft)
- Listing: List of Ultras of Southeast Asia
- Coordinates: 26°41′00″N 97°14′00″E

Geography
- Location: Kachin State, Myanmar
- Parent range: Kachin Hills

Climbing
- First ascent: unknown
- Easiest route: climb

Bumhpa Bum (Burmese: ဘွမ်ဖာဘွမ်) is one of the highest mountains in Myanmar and is located in the Kachin Hills.

With a height of 3,411 m (11,191 ft) and a prominence of 1,636 m (5,367 ft), Bumhpa Bum is one of the ultra prominent peaks of Southeast Asia.

== See also ==
- Kachin Hills
- List of mountains in Burma
- List of ultras of Southeast Asia
