= Machanbaw Township =

Coordinates: 27.2667°N 97.6000°E

Machanbaw Township မချမ်းဘောမြို့နယ်
- Township
- Location in PutaO district
- Country: Burma
- State: Kachin State
- District: Putao District
- Time zone: UTC+6:30 (MST)

Machanbaw Township (Burmese: မချမ်းဘောမြို့နယ်) is a township of Putao District in the Kachin State of Burma. The principal town is Machanbaw.
