= Ar Khi Sar =

Burmese politician

Ah Ki Sar
- အားခီဆာ

Member of the Kachin State Hluttaw
- Constituency: Kawnglanghpu Township No.2

Personal details
- Born: 27 February 1981 (age 45) Sagaing, Myanmar
- Party: National League for Democracy
- Relations: Hti Yotar (father)
- Education: B.A(Eco), B.C.Sc
- Occupation: Politician

Ar Khi Sar (Burmese: အားခီဆာ) is a Burmese politician who currently serves as a Kachin State Hluttaw MP for Kawnglanghpu Township No.2. He is a member of the National League for Democracy.

== Political career ==
He is a member of the National League for Democracy. In the 2015 Myanmar general election and 2020 Myanmar general election, he was elected as an Kachin State Hluttaw MP, and elected representative from Kawnglanghpu Township No.2 parliamentary constituency.
