= Kawnglanghpu Township =

Kawnglanghpu Township ခေါင်လန်ဖူးမြို့နယ်
- Township
- Location in PutaO district

- Location in Burma
- Coordinates: 27°4′N 98°21′E
- Country: Burma
- State: Kachin State
- District: Putao District
- Capital: Kawnglanghpu

Population (2014)
  - Total: 11,655
- Time zone: UTC+6.30 (MST)

Kawnglanghpu Township (Burmese: ခေါင်လန်ဖူးမြို့နယ်) is a township of Putao District in the Kachin State of Burma. The principal town is Kawnglanghpu.
