= Kachin State Cultural Museum =

Coordinates: 25.39243°N 97.40197°E

- Established: 6 November 1994; 31 years ago
- Location: Myitkyina, Kachin State, Myanmar
- Type: Cultural Museum
- Owner: Ministry of Religious Affairs and Culture (Myanmar)

The Kachin State Cultural Museum is a museum that displays figures of Kachin national races and their traditional dresses, traditional looms & textile patterns, silverware & jewellery, household utensils, musical instruments, weapons and models of houses lived in by Kachin people. It is located at No 3, Yongyi Road and Thakhin Nat Pe Road, Myitkyina, Kachin State.

It was established on November 6, 1994. Admission fees are $2US and opening hours are from 10:00 am to 3:30 pm (from Tuesday to Sunday).
