= Kachin Levies =

WW2 British irregular force in Burma

The Kachin Levies were a British special force created in World War II in Burma. The Levies were made up of members of the Kachin people under the command of British officers and they fought the Japanese in the jungle of north Burma.

Edmund Leach set up the Levies at Fort Hertz, and they were initially placed under the command of Colonel Gamble, a retired Australian Burma Military Police officer.

== See also ==
- V Force
