= Putao Township =

Putao Township ပူတာအိုမြို့နယ်
- Township
- Location in Putao district

- Location in Myanmar
- Coordinates: 27°19′N 97°25′E
- Country: Myanmar
- State: Kachin State
- District: Putao District
- Capital: Putao

Area
  - Total: 2,105.46 sq mi (5,453.12 km^{2})
- Elevation: 1,419 ft (433 m)
- Highest elevation: 11,500 ft (3,500 m)

Population (2019)
  - Total: 63,869
  - Density: 30.335/sq mi (11.712/km^{2})
  - Ethnicities: Kachin
- Time zone: UTC+6.30 (MMT)

Putao Township (Burmese: ပူတာအိုမြို့နယ်) is a township of Putao District in the Kachin State of Burma. The principal town is Putao.

The resort town of Mulashidi is in Putao Township.
