= Pianma Incident =

Border dispute between British Burma and China

The Pianma Incident began in 1910, from a dispute in the Pianma Kachin Chiefdom under Qing China suzerainty, between Pianma's Tusi (indigenous governments) and other local leaders, and the subsequent British Burman occupation of the Qing Empire's territories.

Two headmen raised their grievances against Tusi to the Qing Government. However, when the Qing government rejected them, they petitioned the British to recognize Pianma under British domain. The British accepted their request, tried to induce Tusi to switch allegiance from the Qing Dynasty to the British Crown and deployed troops to occupy the region. Britain subsequently forced the emerging Republic of China (ROC) to give up another portion of territory, Jiangxinpo, in what is now Northern Kachin state of Burma in 1926–27, as well as some part of the Wa states in 1940.

The People's Republic of China (PRC) and Burma signed a border treaty in 1960, with the PRC recognizing most of these disputed territories as belonging to Burma. Burma relinquished a small amount of that territory; namely Hpimaw (Pianma) and adjacent Gawlam (Gulang) and Kangfang to the PRC.

The Republic of China (now Taiwan) did not recognize the British seizure of these territories nor the PRC-Burma agreement.

== See also ==
- Kachin Hills
- Former Yunnan Province, Republic of China
