= Gangfang =

Gangfang 岗房 Kangfang, Ganfai
- Location in Yunnan Province
- Coordinates: 26°6′57″N 98°35′42″E
- Country: China
- Province: Yunnan
- Prefecture: Nujiang Lisu Autonomous Prefecture
- County: Lushui
- Town: Pianma
- Time zone: UTC+8 (UTC + 8:00)

Gangfang, also known as Kangfang, is a village in Lushui county in Nujiang Lisu Autonomous Prefecture in Yunnan, China. It is located on the border with Myanmar's Kachin State. The village was seized by British colonial forces in 1910, initiating a long-running border dispute that was resolved in 1960 when the village was transferred to China as part of a 1960 border treaty between Burma and China.

== History ==
The area around Pianma, including Gangfang village, had previously had ties with both Burmese Kingdoms and Qing dynasty. After the British annexation of Upper Burma as a result of the Third Anglo-Burmese War, the British effectively claimed all territories that had once been tied to the previous Burmese kingdoms, and their demands for boundaries clearly defined by natural barriers conflicted with the reality of pre-existing tusi zhidu dating back to the Ming dynasty.

Negotiations between the Qing dynasty and the British resolved most of the disputed border between the 1890s and early 1900s, however a couple of regions remained disputed due to the strong ties of the local tusi. In 1910, after many years, the Denggeng tusi who claimed jurisdiction over the area since the reign of the Yongzheng Emperor, attempted to collect taxes on the villages in the Pianma region, the local villagers refused to pay the tax and appealed for help to the British who, on 5 December 1910, launched the Pianma expedition to secure their claim on the region.

British officials, including the leader of the expedition W. A. Hertz and Harvey Adamson, acknowledged the weakness and impracticality of the British claim to the area, however the British government maintained its claim.

Due to the turmoil following the 1911 Revolution, the new Governor of Yunnan, Cai E, was forced to take a diplomatic approach allowing the British to strengthen their control of the area freezing the dispute.

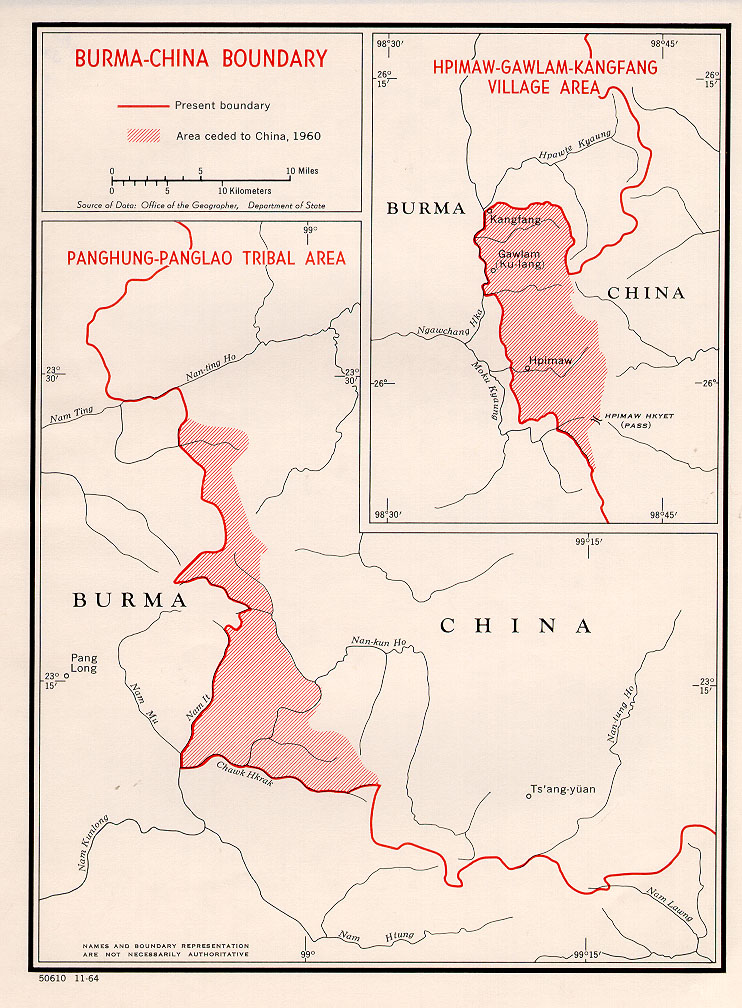
Map of areas ceded to China: Pianma (Hpimaw), Banhong (Panghung) and Banlao (Panglao) townships as a result of the 1960 border treaty

Following the end of British colonial rule in Burma, negotiations on the border issue resumed, primarily driven by the Yellow Orchard Event in 1955, when the poorly defined border led to a confrontation between the Burmese army and the People's Liberation Army who were sent to hunt down the Kuomintang, with a preliminary agreement reached between U Nu and Zhou Enlai for the withdrawal of troops from the disputed regions, including the villages of Pianma, Gangfang and Gawlam by 1 January 1957.

A final agreement on the border was reached in 1960 after talks between Zhou Enlai and Ne Win with China giving up their maximalist claims and receiving the Pianma area, including Gangfang, as well the Panghung-Panglao area in exchange for giving up their claim on the Namwan Assigned Tract. The treaty was first signed on 28 January 1960, with the agreement being finalized on 1 October 1960 and the border being marked on the ground in 1961.

The largely Christian local Kachin population was angered by this treaty as they felt that a large part of their native land had been given over to China. This anger was further exacerbated when Buddhism became the state religion in 1961 and lead to the 1961 formation of the Kachin Independence Army (KIA) and the start of the Kachin conflict.

== Ecosystem ==
The village of Gangfang and the surrounding area has long been the focus of wildlife studies. Arthur Stannard Vernay and C. Suydam Cutting led a 1938–39 expedition to the area, using the village as their basecamp, describing it as a cluster of long dark Chinese huts.

In 2010 a new critically endangered species, the Myanmar snub-nosed monkey, was discovered on the Myanmar side of the border, with later studies finding a population in the Pianma region.

== Present ==
Since 2001, logging activity on the Chinese side have made the Gangfang area more accessible due to the construction of logging roads. This combined with porous nature of the border have made Gangfang a key gateway for smuggling into China, including logs and poached animal parts with the primary target of the poachers being the Asian black bear, but also macaque, snub-nosed monkeys and colobinae, it is also where poachers are able to obtain their traps and weapons.

The area has been the scene of clashes during the Myanmar civil war, with the KIA gaining control of the border from the pro-Tatmadaw, New Democratic Army – Kachin pushing the latter to the Gangfang border.
