= Putao, Myanmar =

Town in Kachin State, Myanmar

Putao ပူတာအိုမြို့
- Location in Burma
- Coordinates: 27°19′33″N 97°25′21″E
- Country: Myanmar
- Division: Kachin State
- District: Putao District
- Township: Putao Township

Population
  - Total: 10,000
  - Ethnicities: Kachin; Hkamti Shan; Bamar
  - Religions: Buddhism; Christianity
- Time zone: UTC+6.30 (MST)

Putao (Burmese: ပူတာအိုမြို့) is a town in Kachin State, Myanmar and the principal town in Putao Township. The area around Putao is famous for its variety of birds and rare orchids, especially the so-called "Black Orchid" found in the mountains surrounding Putao. Myanmar's highest mountain, Hkakabo Razi, and other snow-capped peaks are visible from Putao. Putao means "town an old man is looking at" in Shan.

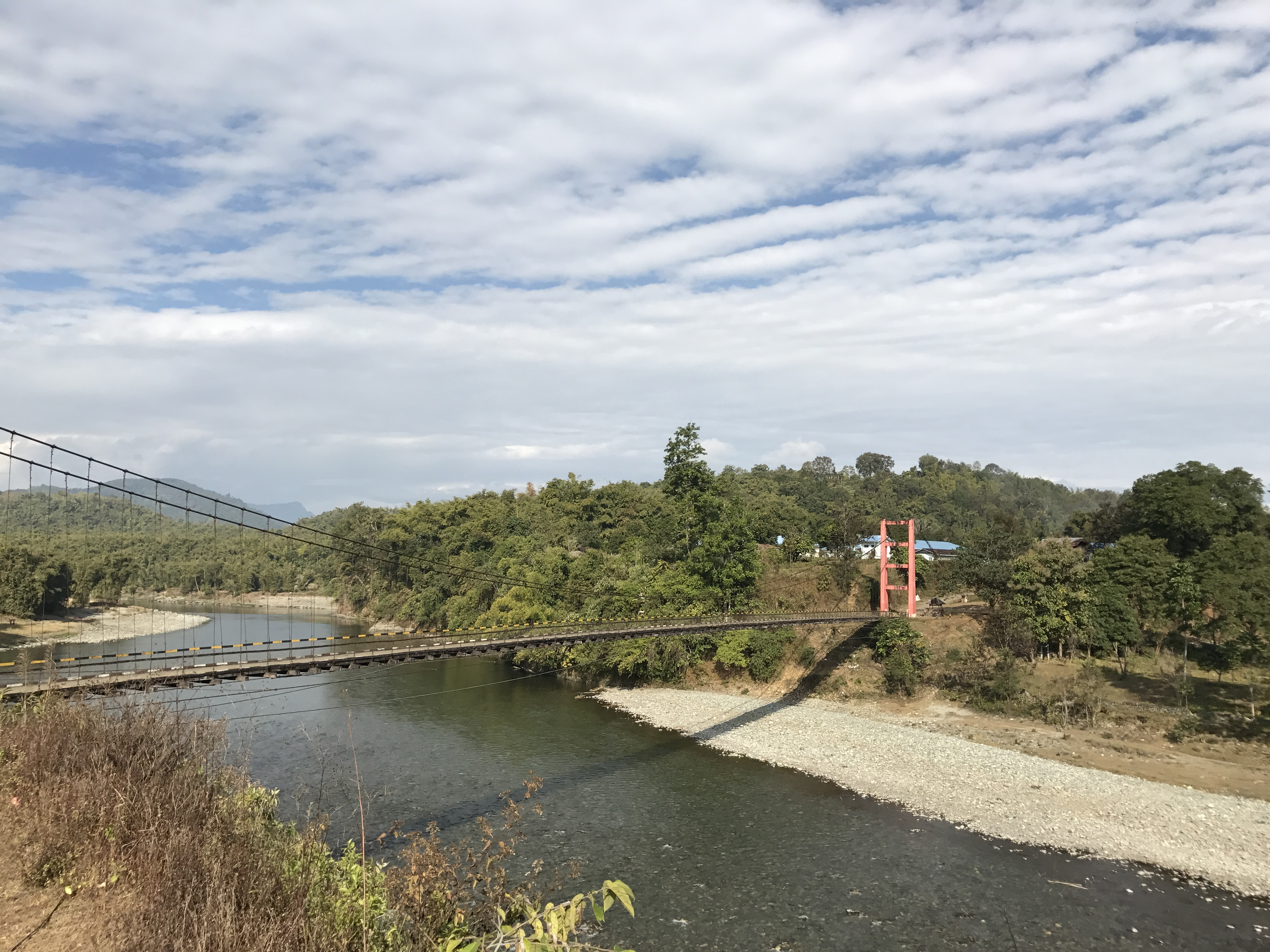
A bridge on Mulashidi River in Putao Valley

== History ==
=== Hkamti Long ===
Hkamti Long (also known as Khamti Long) is the former name of one of the outlying Shan States. It was a princely state around the city of Putao settled by the Khamti Shan people. The name means "Great Place of Gold" in the Khamti Shan language. Nowadays, there are Rawang and Lisu people, who are already regarded as part of Kachin ethnic minority. The seven-day-trek to West-Putao's mountain region, in which explorers found that there are Taron people ethnic whose height is lower than four feet. The population of this ethnic minority is so few nowadays that they are facing the threat of being extinct. The area covered by Hkamti Long may have included parts of what is now Kachin State (where Putao is located) as well as that of Shan State.

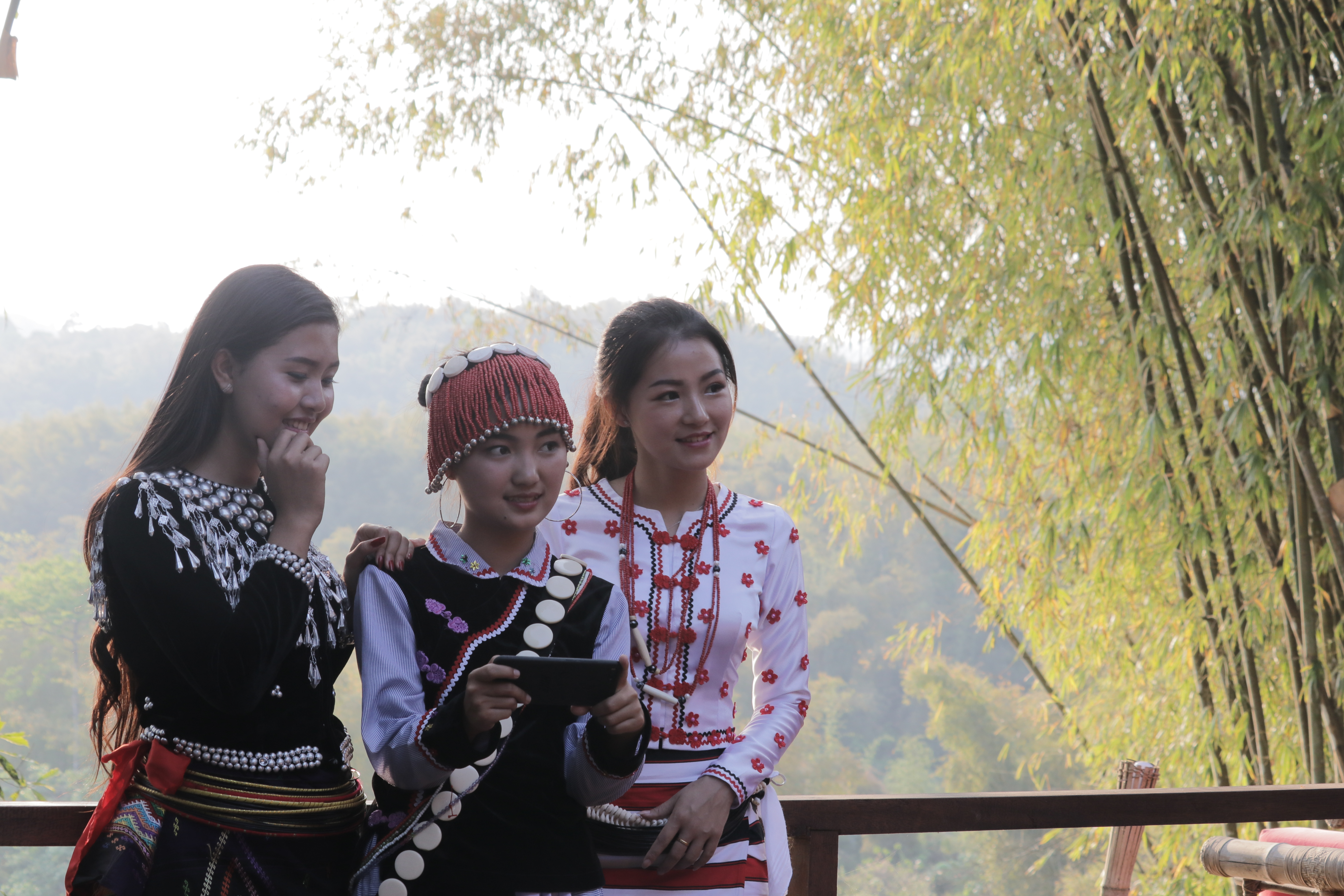
Jingpo girl, Lisu girl and Rawang girl (From left to right) in Putao

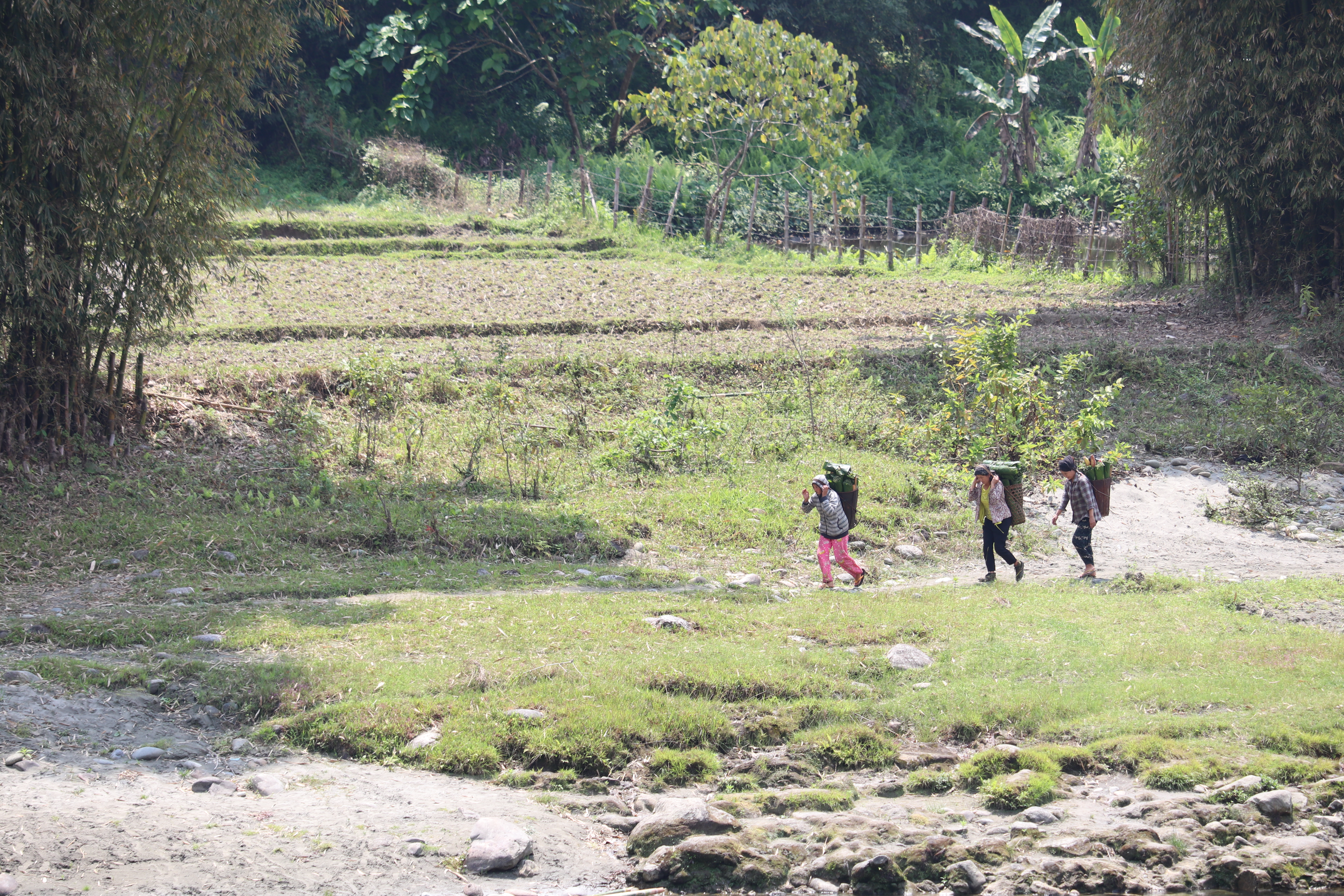
Three local women heading to Putao Market to sell their goods.

=== World War II ===
A British military outpost, Fort Hertz, was established in 1914 near the town of Putao. Due to its remoteness, it was never captured by the Japanese military during the Burma Campaign, remaining in Allied hands throughout World War II. Although later disbanded, the remains of the fort are still visible.

== Geography ==
Putao is roughly 1,000 feet above sea level. Although surrounded by mountains, Putao itself is located on a plain.

== Climate ==
The climate of Putao is a monsoon-influenced humid subtropical climate (Köppen Cwa) with a very high amount of precipitation throughout the monsoon season. The average temperature in January is 13.1 °C, while August is the hottest month with an average of 26.6 °C.

Climate data for Putao, elevation 409 m (1,342 ft), (1991–2020)
Month	Jan	Feb	Mar	Apr	May	Jun	Jul	Aug	Sep	Oct	Nov	Dec	Year
Record high °C (°F)	26.5 (79.7)	29.5 (85.1)	34.5 (94.1)	38.5 (101.3)	37.0 (98.6)	37.5 (99.5)	38.0 (100.4)	36.5 (97.7)	35.0 (95.0)	35.5 (95.9)	30.5 (86.9)	26.5 (79.7)	38.5 (101.3)
Mean daily maximum °C (°F)	21.1 (70.0)	23.1 (73.6)	24.9 (76.8)	26.8 (80.2)	29.3 (84.7)	29.5 (85.1)	29.3 (84.7)	30.3 (86.5)	29.8 (85.6)	28.7 (83.7)	25.7 (78.3)	21.9 (71.4)	26.4 (79.5)
Daily mean °C (°F)	13.1 (55.6)	16.5 (61.7)	18.9 (66.0)	21.4 (70.5)	24.6 (76.3)	26.0 (78.8)	26.1 (79.0)	26.6 (79.9)	26.1 (79.0)	23.8 (74.8)	19.3 (66.7)	14.8 (58.6)	21.5 (70.7)
Mean daily minimum °C (°F)	7.0 (44.6)	9.8 (49.6)	12.9 (55.2)	16.0 (60.8)	19.8 (67.6)	22.4 (72.3)	22.9 (73.2)	22.9 (73.2)	22.5 (72.5)	18.9 (66.0)	12.9 (55.2)	8.0 (46.4)	16.4 (61.5)
Record low °C (°F)	1.5 (34.7)	2.0 (35.6)	6.0 (42.8)	10.5 (50.9)	13.5 (56.3)	18.0 (64.4)	16.3 (61.3)	17.5 (63.5)	18.3 (64.9)	11.6 (52.9)	5.0 (41.0)	1.5 (34.7)	1.5 (34.7)
Average precipitation mm (inches)	19.4 (0.76)	39.7 (1.56)	99.4 (3.91)	143.8 (5.66)	228.7 (9.00)	708.3 (27.89)	1,088.9 (42.87)	969.1 (38.15)	696.9 (27.44)	188.6 (7.43)	23.5 (0.93)	9.9 (0.39)	4,216.2 (165.99)
Average precipitation days (≥ 1.0 mm)	4.4	6.4	12.0	15.0	16.3	25.3	29.3	27.2	23.6	12.9	3.5	1.7	177.5
Source: World Meteorological Organization

== Transportation ==
Putao is a transportation hub for far-northern Myanmar, and commercial flights arrive seasonally at the town's airport.

== Tourist attractions ==
In addition to the mountains, the main attractions in the Putao area include rare orchids and herbs, Burmese Cordyceps (ရှီးပတီး), and Kaungmhulon, a Buddhist pagoda.

== See also ==
- Putao Airport
- Putao Tourism Information
