= Lushui =

Lushui 泸水市 · ꓡꓴꓽ-ꓢꓴꓲ ꓫꓵꓹ
- County-level city
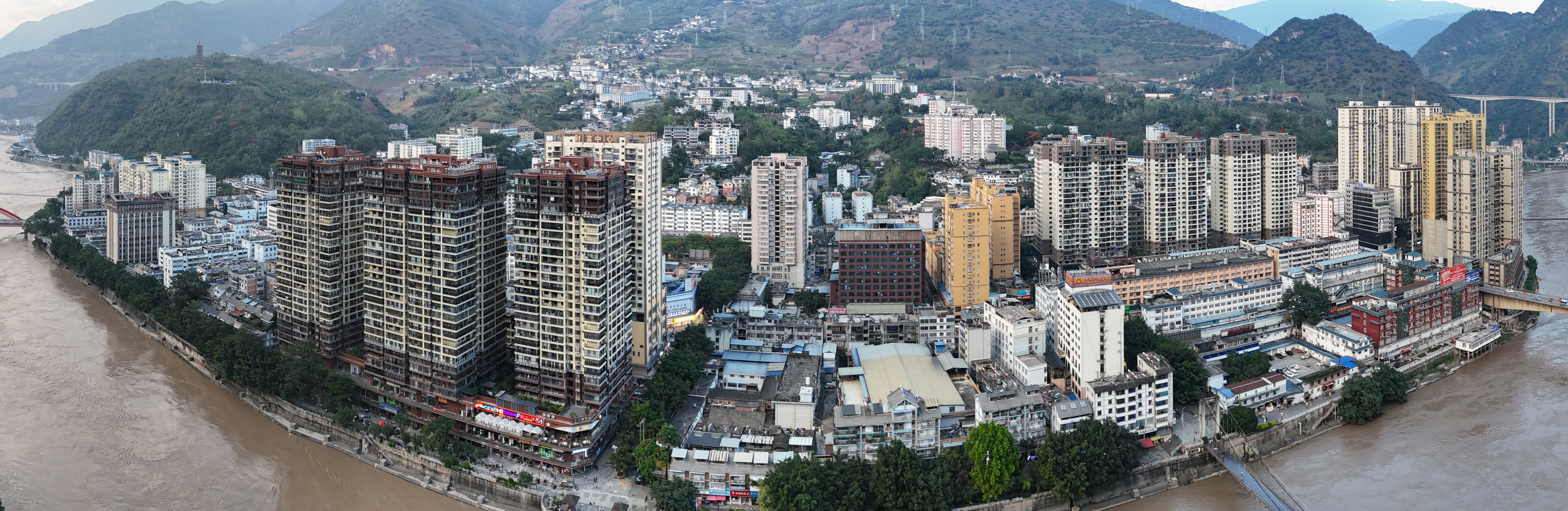
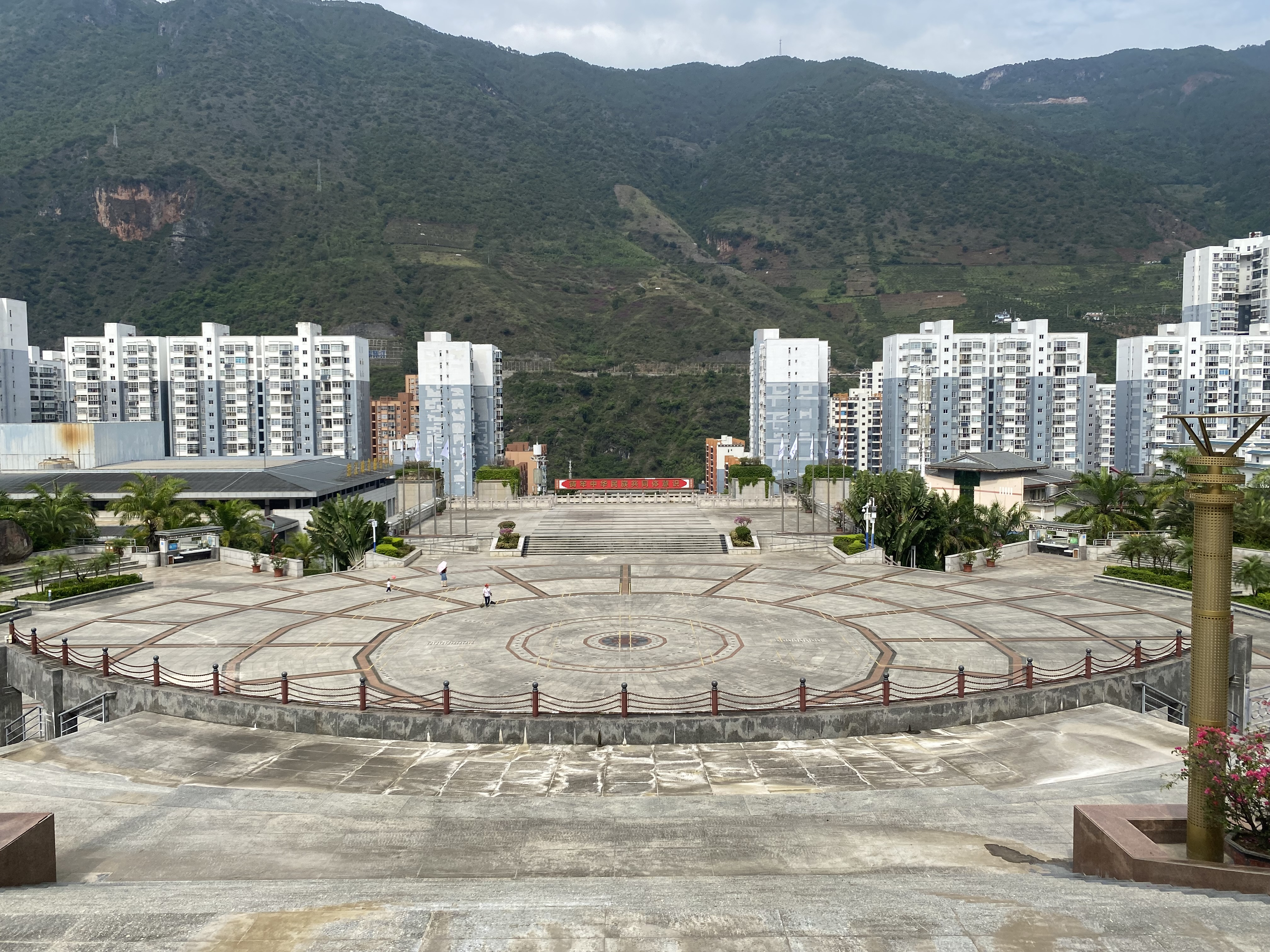
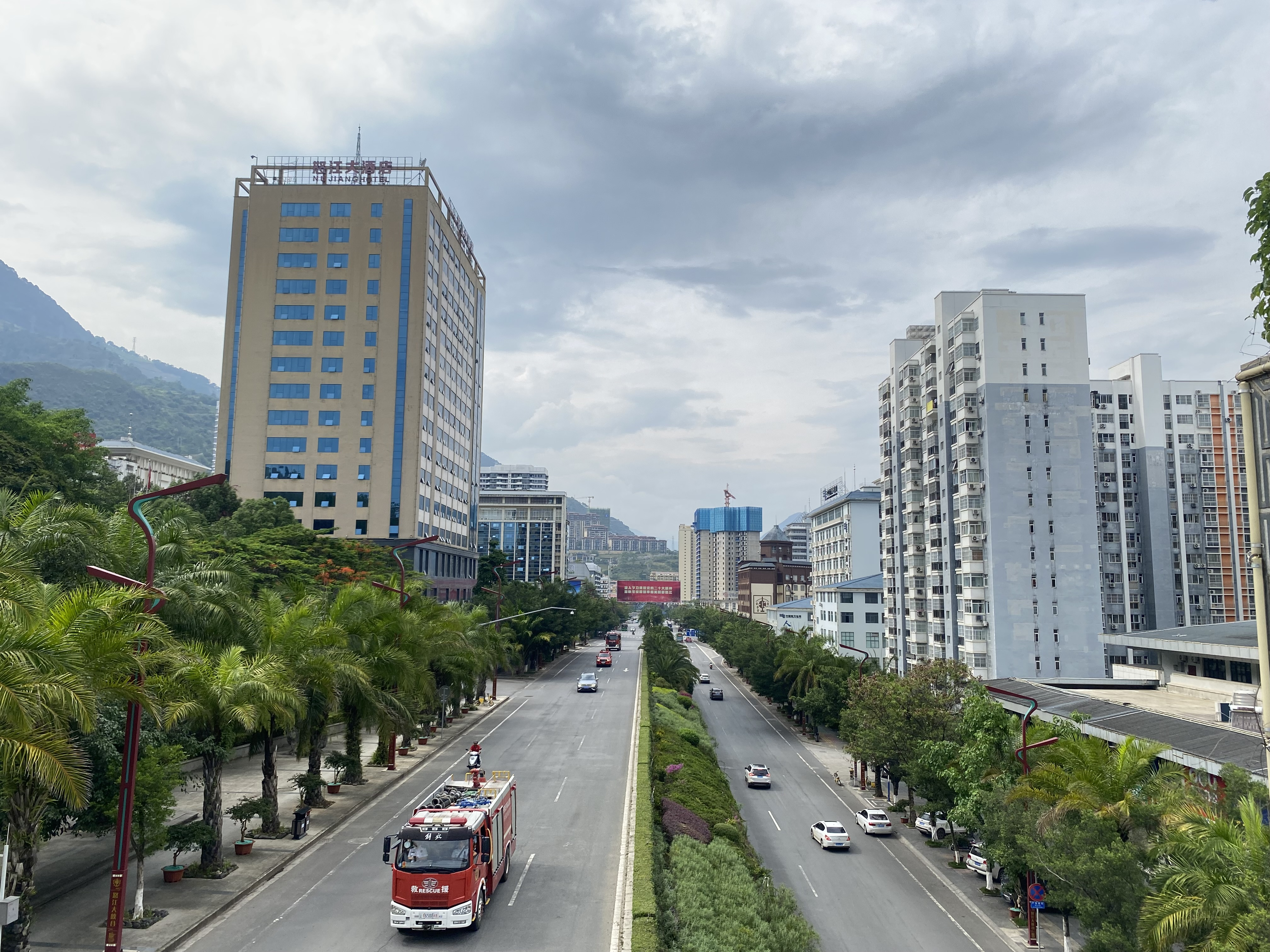
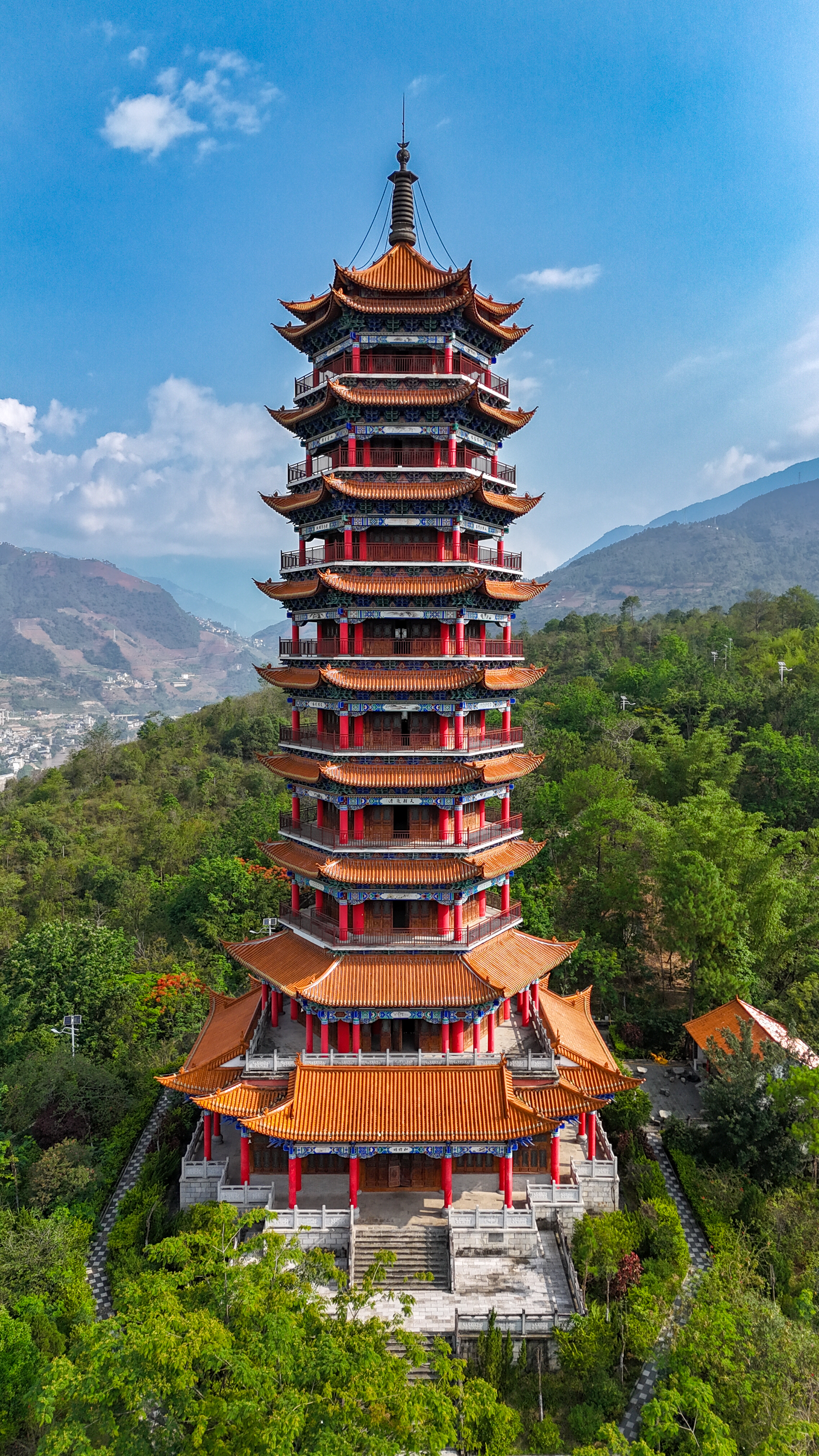
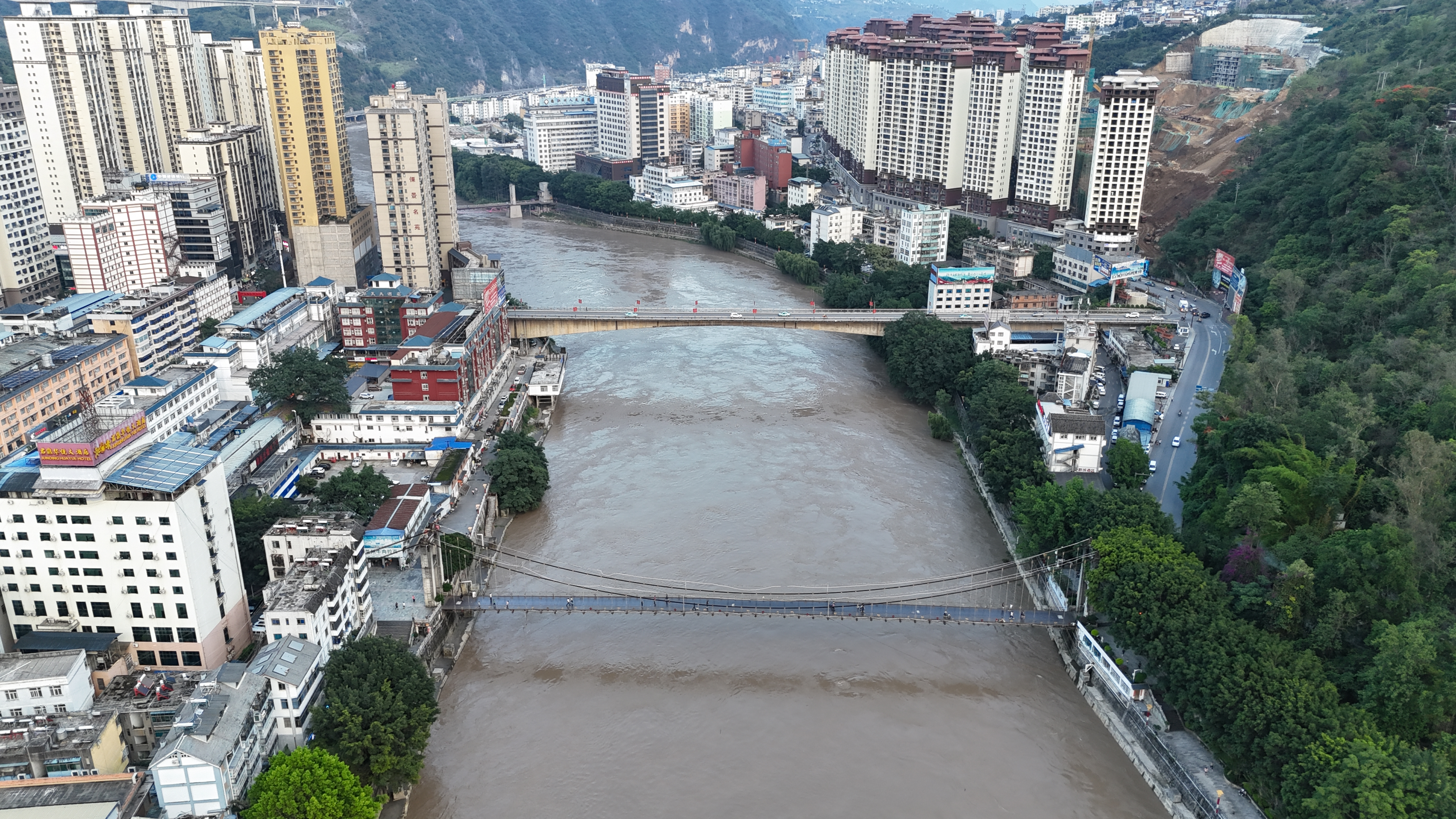
- Cityscape of Liuku Subdistrict Tongxin Square Nujiang Avenue Peaceful Tower Nujiang River across Lushui downtown

- Location in Yunnan Lushui (China)
- Coordinates (Lushui municipal government): 25°49′21″N 98°51′28″E
- Country: China
- Province: Yunnan
- Autonomous prefecture: Nujiang
- Municipal seat: Liuku Subdistrict

Area
  - Total: 2,938 km^{2} (1,134 sq mi)

Population (2020 census)
  - Total: 203,977
  - Density: 69.43/km^{2} (179.8/sq mi)
- Time zone: UTC+8 (CST)
- Postal code: 673200
- Area code: 0886
- Website: www.ynls.gov.cn

Lushui (simplified Chinese: 泸水; traditional Chinese: 瀘水; pinyin: Lúshuǐ, Lisu: ꓡꓴꓽ-ꓢꓴꓲ) is a county-level city in and the seat of Nujiang Prefecture, western Yunnan Province, China. It borders Myanmar's Kachin State to the west and occupies the southern fifth of Nujiang Prefecture.

== Administrative divisions ==
Lushui City has 2 subdistricts, 5 towns, 2 townships and 1 ethnic township.

2 subdistricts

- Daliandi Subdistrict (大练地街道)
- Liuku Subdistrict (六库街道)

6 towns

- Luzhang (鲁掌镇)
- Pianma (片马镇)
- Shangjiang (上江镇)
- Miaoba (老窝镇)
- Daxingde (大兴地镇)

2 townships

- Chenggan Township (称杆乡)
- Gudeng Township (古登乡)

1 ethnic township

- Luobenzhuo Bai Ethnic Township (洛本卓白族乡)

== Climate ==
Climate data for Lushui (Liuku), elevation 950 m (3,120 ft), (1991–2020 normals, extremes 1981–present)
Month	Jan	Feb	Mar	Apr	May	Jun	Jul	Aug	Sep	Oct	Nov	Dec	Year
Record high °C (°F)	27.1 (80.8)	32.8 (91.0)	35.7 (96.3)	37.7 (99.9)	39.9 (103.8)	39.2 (102.6)	37.4 (99.3)	36.1 (97.0)	36.4 (97.5)	35.5 (95.9)	31.1 (88.0)	27.7 (81.9)	39.9 (103.8)
Mean daily maximum °C (°F)	21.3 (70.3)	23.5 (74.3)	26.2 (79.2)	28.1 (82.6)	29.9 (85.8)	30.4 (86.7)	29.7 (85.5)	30.0 (86.0)	29.2 (84.6)	26.9 (80.4)	24.2 (75.6)	21.8 (71.2)	26.8 (80.2)
Daily mean °C (°F)	13.6 (56.5)	15.9 (60.6)	18.8 (65.8)	21.3 (70.3)	23.8 (74.8)	25.4 (77.7)	25.0 (77.0)	24.9 (76.8)	23.8 (74.8)	21.1 (70.0)	17.0 (62.6)	14.1 (57.4)	20.4 (68.7)
Mean daily minimum °C (°F)	8.1 (46.6)	10.1 (50.2)	13.5 (56.3)	16.4 (61.5)	19.4 (66.9)	21.9 (71.4)	22.0 (71.6)	21.8 (71.2)	20.6 (69.1)	17.5 (63.5)	12.4 (54.3)	8.9 (48.0)	16.1 (60.9)
Record low °C (°F)	3.8 (38.8)	4.7 (40.5)	4.0 (39.2)	9.5 (49.1)	13.1 (55.6)	16.1 (61.0)	16.3 (61.3)	17.3 (63.1)	12.7 (54.9)	10.7 (51.3)	6.7 (44.1)	3.3 (37.9)	3.3 (37.9)
Average precipitation mm (inches)	18.9 (0.74)	22.7 (0.89)	42.5 (1.67)	47.0 (1.85)	99.2 (3.91)	111.5 (4.39)	183.5 (7.22)	173.1 (6.81)	127.2 (5.01)	95.4 (3.76)	23.5 (0.93)	8.1 (0.32)	952.6 (37.5)
Average precipitation days (≥ 0.1 mm)	4.3	6.3	9.4	12.8	14.4	17.8	22.3	20.9	17.8	12.8	4.8	2.6	146.2
Average relative humidity (%)	57	51	51	56	63	73	80	81	80	76	67	62	66
Mean monthly sunshine hours	199.5	171.8	172.9	166.2	156.3	119.3	107.3	129.8	127.9	150.4	191.3	208.5	1,901.2
Percentage possible sunshine	60	54	46	43	38	29	26	32	35	42	59	64	44
Source: China Meteorological Administration all-time extreme temperatureall-time November record high

Climate data for Luzhang Town, Lushui, elevation 1,805 m (5,922 ft), (1991–2020 normals)
Month	Jan	Feb	Mar	Apr	May	Jun	Jul	Aug	Sep	Oct	Nov	Dec	Year
Mean daily maximum °C (°F)	14.3 (57.7)	16.0 (60.8)	18.9 (66.0)	21.6 (70.9)	22.5 (72.5)	23.4 (74.1)	22.9 (73.2)	23.4 (74.1)	22.7 (72.9)	20.7 (69.3)	17.7 (63.9)	15.2 (59.4)	19.9 (67.9)
Daily mean °C (°F)	9.3 (48.7)	10.7 (51.3)	13.3 (55.9)	16.0 (60.8)	18.1 (64.6)	19.7 (67.5)	19.5 (67.1)	19.7 (67.5)	18.8 (65.8)	16.7 (62.1)	13.1 (55.6)	10.3 (50.5)	15.4 (59.8)
Mean daily minimum °C (°F)	5.3 (41.5)	6.6 (43.9)	9.3 (48.7)	11.9 (53.4)	15.0 (59.0)	17.3 (63.1)	17.4 (63.3)	17.5 (63.5)	16.5 (61.7)	13.9 (57.0)	9.7 (49.5)	6.3 (43.3)	12.2 (54.0)
Average precipitation mm (inches)	31.8 (1.25)	52.6 (2.07)	92.3 (3.63)	56.2 (2.21)	133.8 (5.27)	116.9 (4.60)	205.4 (8.09)	192.1 (7.56)	161.6 (6.36)	98.0 (3.86)	38.0 (1.50)	13.4 (0.53)	1,192.1 (46.93)
Average precipitation days (≥ 0.1 mm)	5.7	9.2	12.6	13.5	18.3	19.8	24.3	22.9	18.8	12.3	6.8	2.5	166.7
Average snowy days	0.1	0.1	0	0	0	0	0	0	0	0	0	0	0.2
Average relative humidity (%)	58	58	58	62	73	83	89	86	84	78	70	61	72
Mean monthly sunshine hours	225.0	196.0	204.1	202.6	162.8	125.2	105.0	126.3	146.9	180.3	209.2	245.4	2,128.8
Percentage possible sunshine	68	61	54	53	39	31	25	32	40	51	65	75	50
Source: China Meteorological Administration

== See also ==
- Three Parallel Rivers of Yunnan Protected Areas - Unesco World Heritage Site
- Gaoligong Mountains
