= Putao Airport =

Airport in Myanmar

- IATA: PBU; ICAO: VYPT

Summary
- Location: Putao, Myanmar
- Elevation AMSL: 1,524 ft (465 m)
- Coordinates: 27°19′48″N 097°25′35″E

Map
- Location of airport in Myanmar

Runways
Direction	Length		Surface
Direction	ft	m	Surface
17/35	7,002	2,134	Bitumen

Putao Airport (IATA: PBU, ICAO: VYPT) is an airport in Putao, Myanmar. The airport was originally part of Fort Hertz, which served as an isolated British outpost during the Burma Campaign in World War II.

== Airlines and destinations ==
Airlines	Destinations
Air Thanlwin	Myitkyina
Mann Yatanarpon Airlines	Mandalay
Mingalar Aviation Services	Myitkyina
Myanmar Airways International	Myitkyina
Myanmar National Airlines	Myitkyina
