= Putao District =

District of Kachin, Myanmar

Coordinates: 27°16′N 97°47′E

Putao District (Burmese: ပူတာအိုခရိုင်) is the northernmost district of Myanmar and part of the Kachin State in northern Burma bordering China. The capital lies at Putao.

Location in Kachin State

== Townships ==
The district is divided into five administrative townships:

- Putao Township
- Sumprabum Township
- Machanbaw Township
- Kawnglanghpu Township
- Nogmung Township

== Transportation ==
The main link to Putao district is the Putao Airport located in the main town of Putao.

== Tourism ==
Hkakabo Razi, the highest peak in Myanmar, is located in Putao District along the northern border with China. The peak, at the southern end of the Himalayas, is snow-capped year-round and is a favorite among Burmese climbers and international visitors.
