= Kachin State =

State of Myanmar

Kachin State ကချင်ပြည်နယ် (Burmese) Jinghpaw Mungdaw (Kachin)
- State
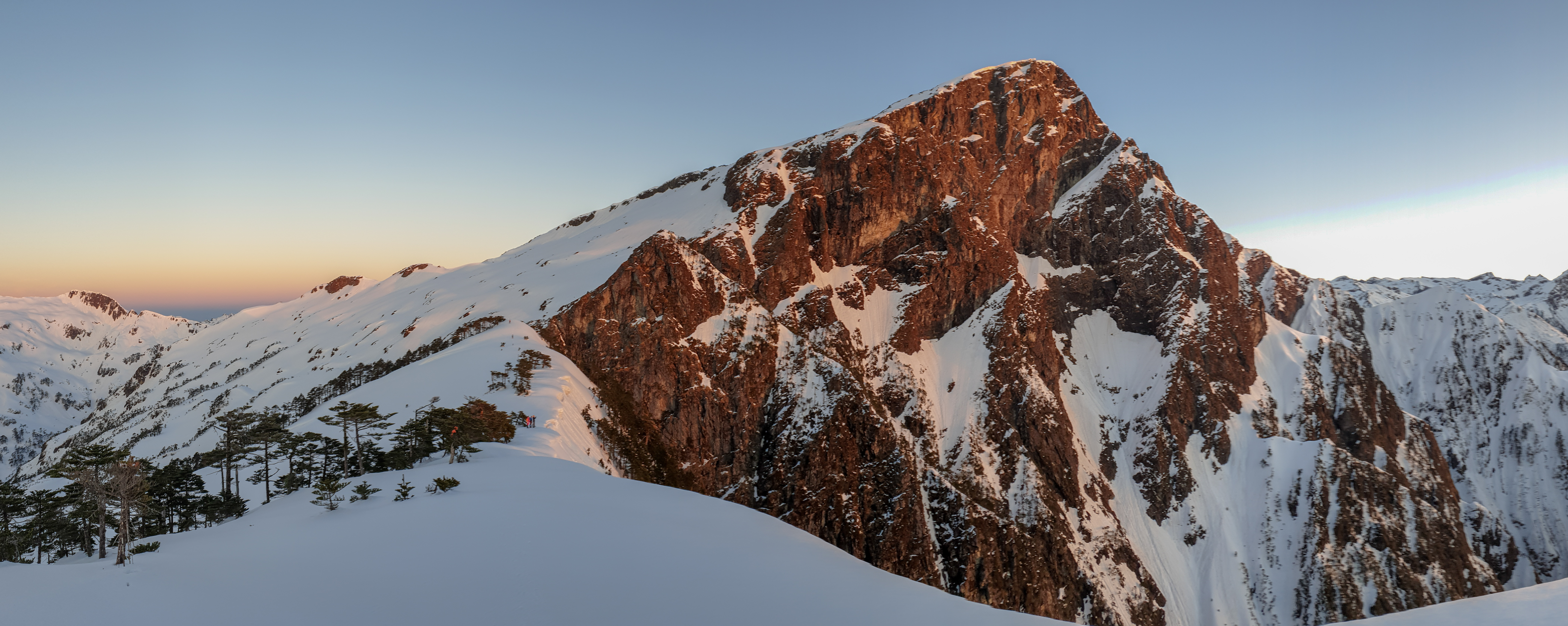
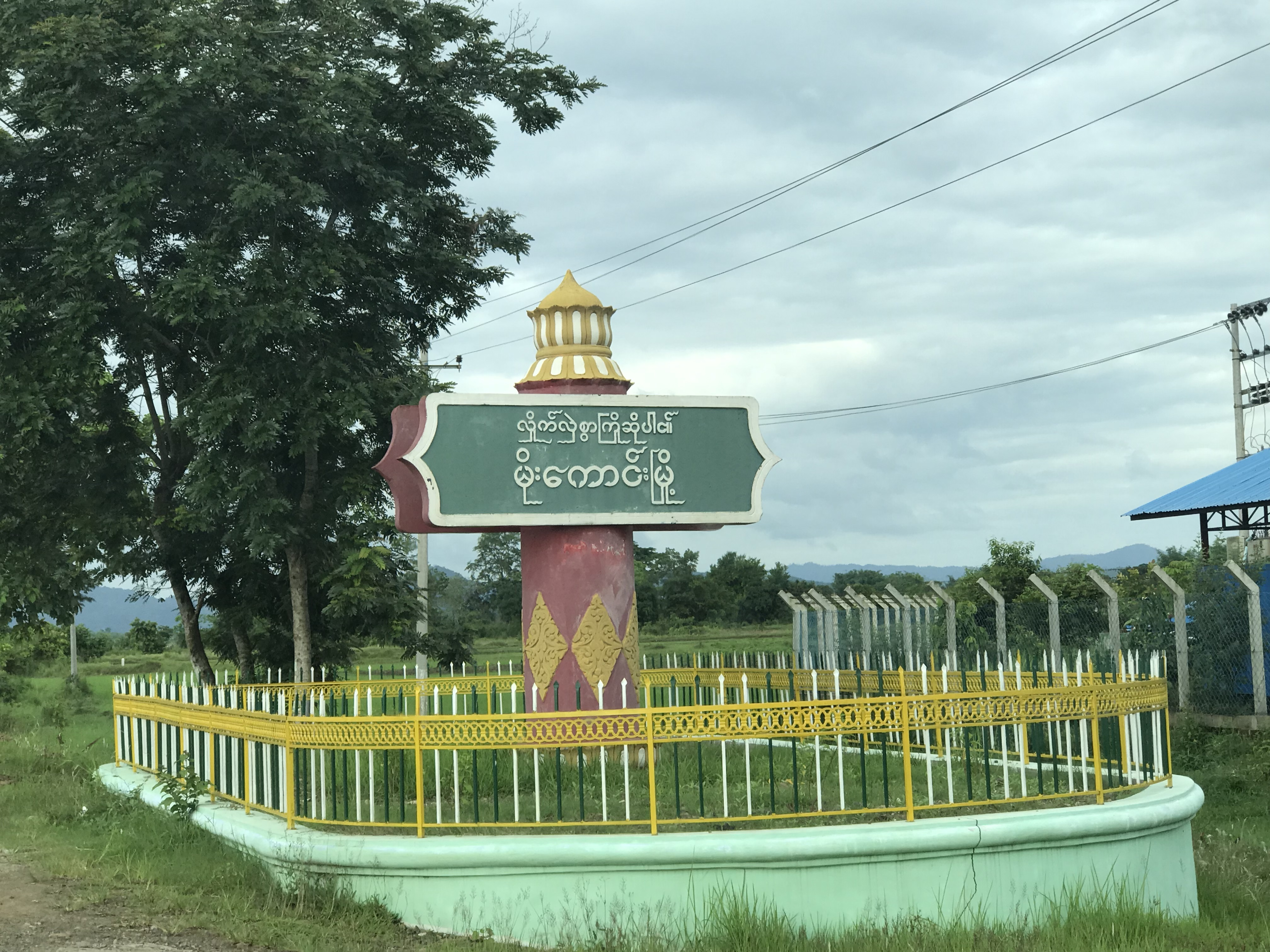
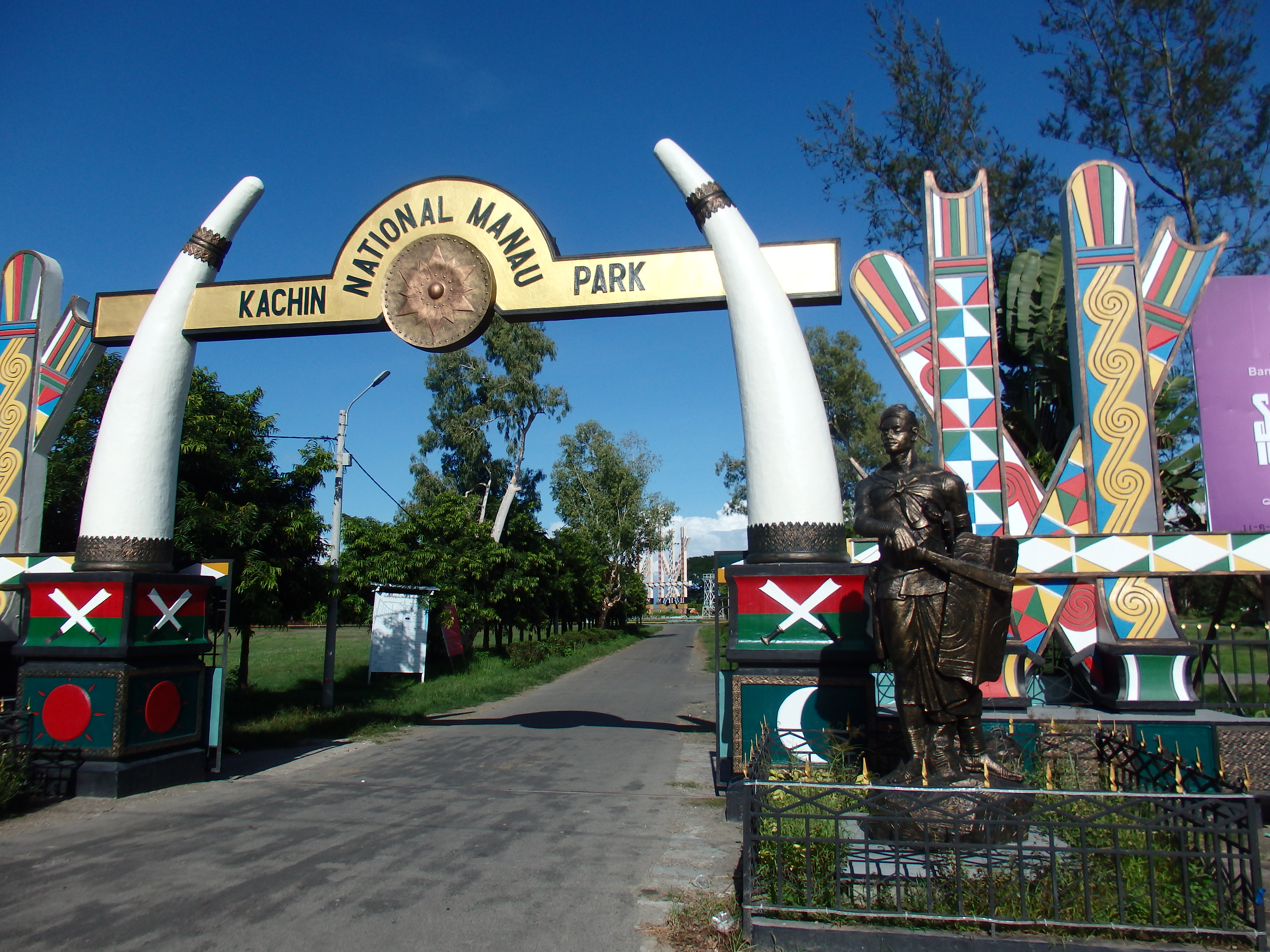
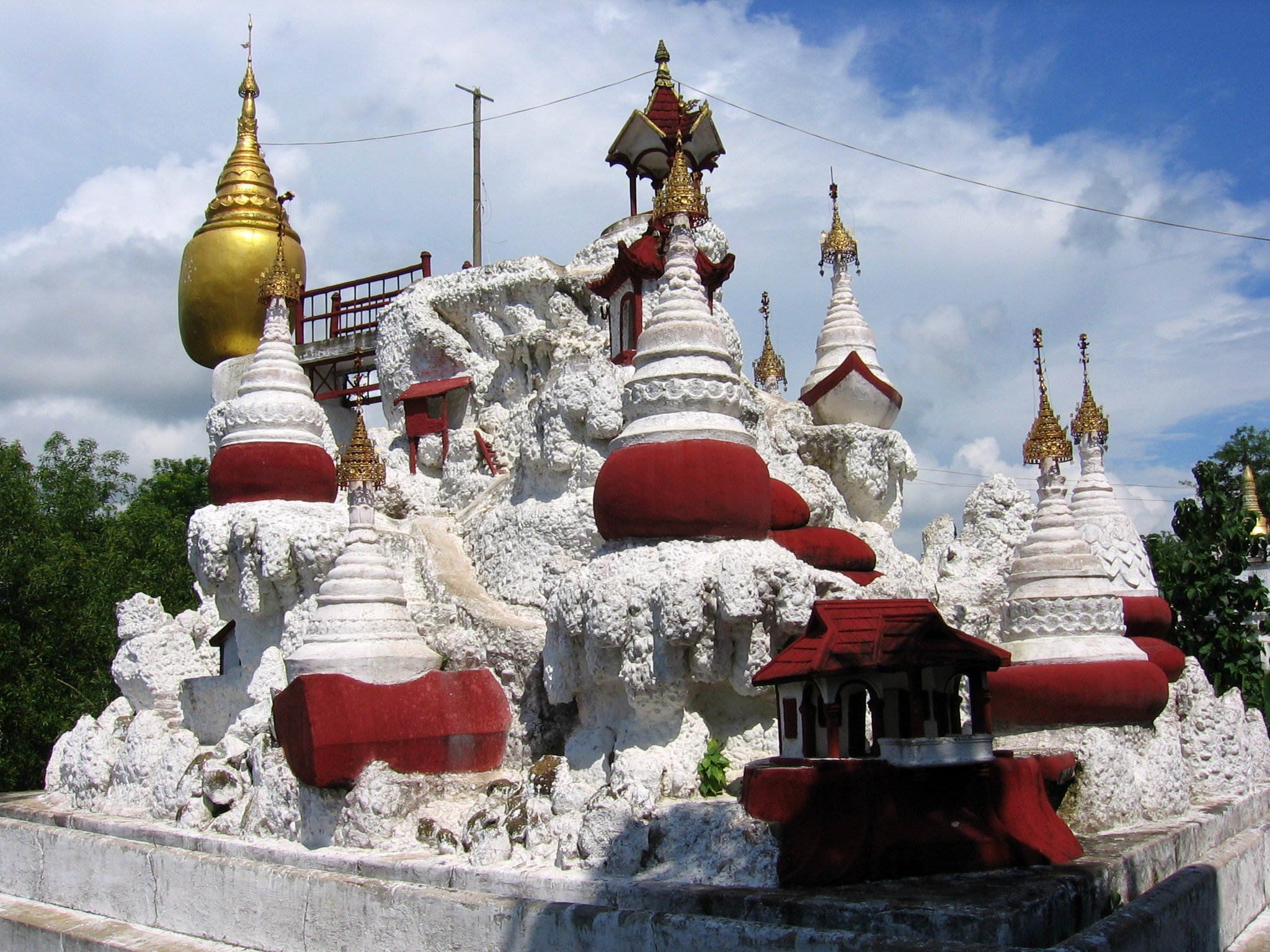
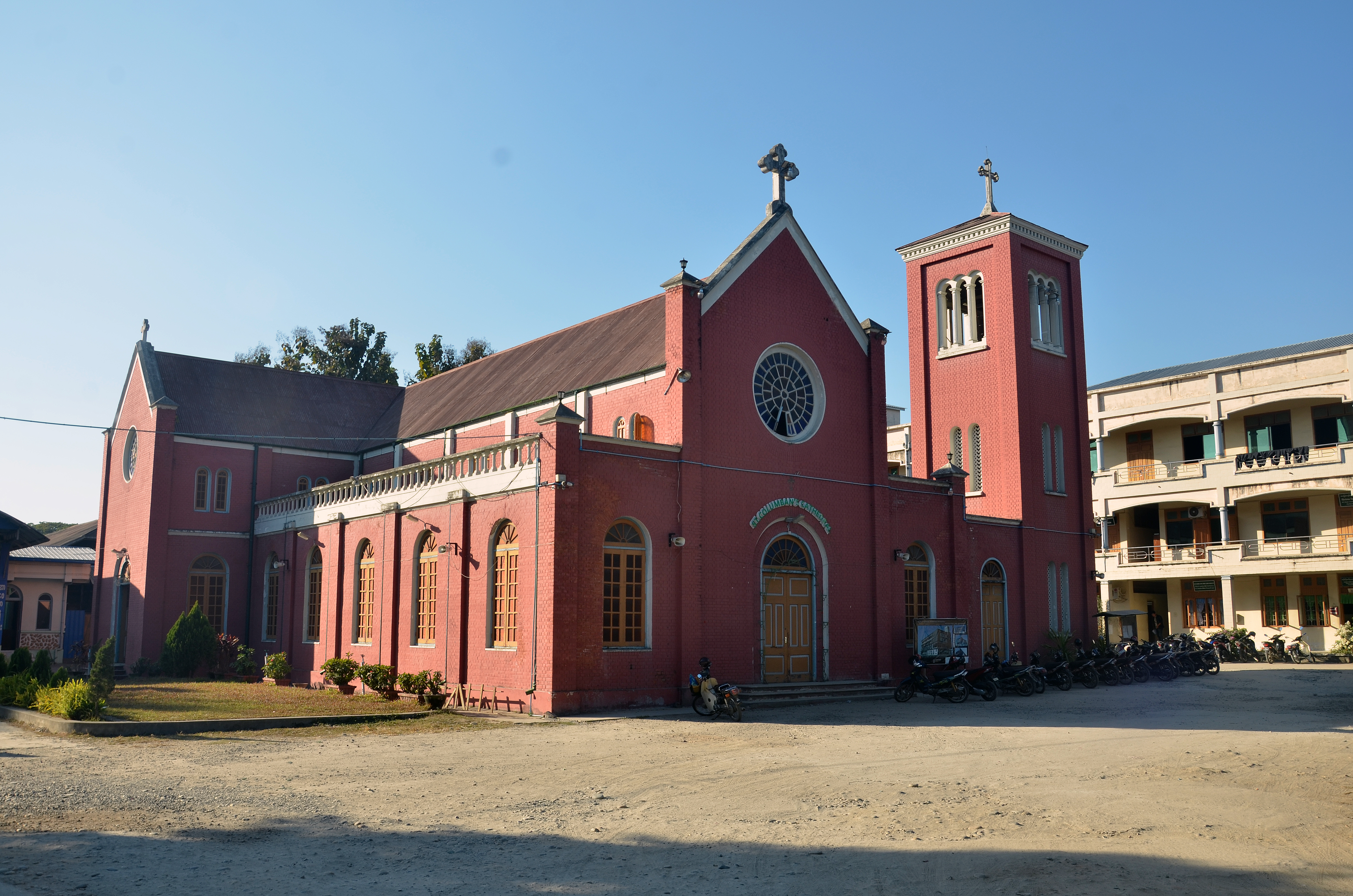
- Phangran Razi in Kachin State Mogaung town National park gate Shwe Kyina Pagoda, Bhamo St. Columban's Cathedral Church

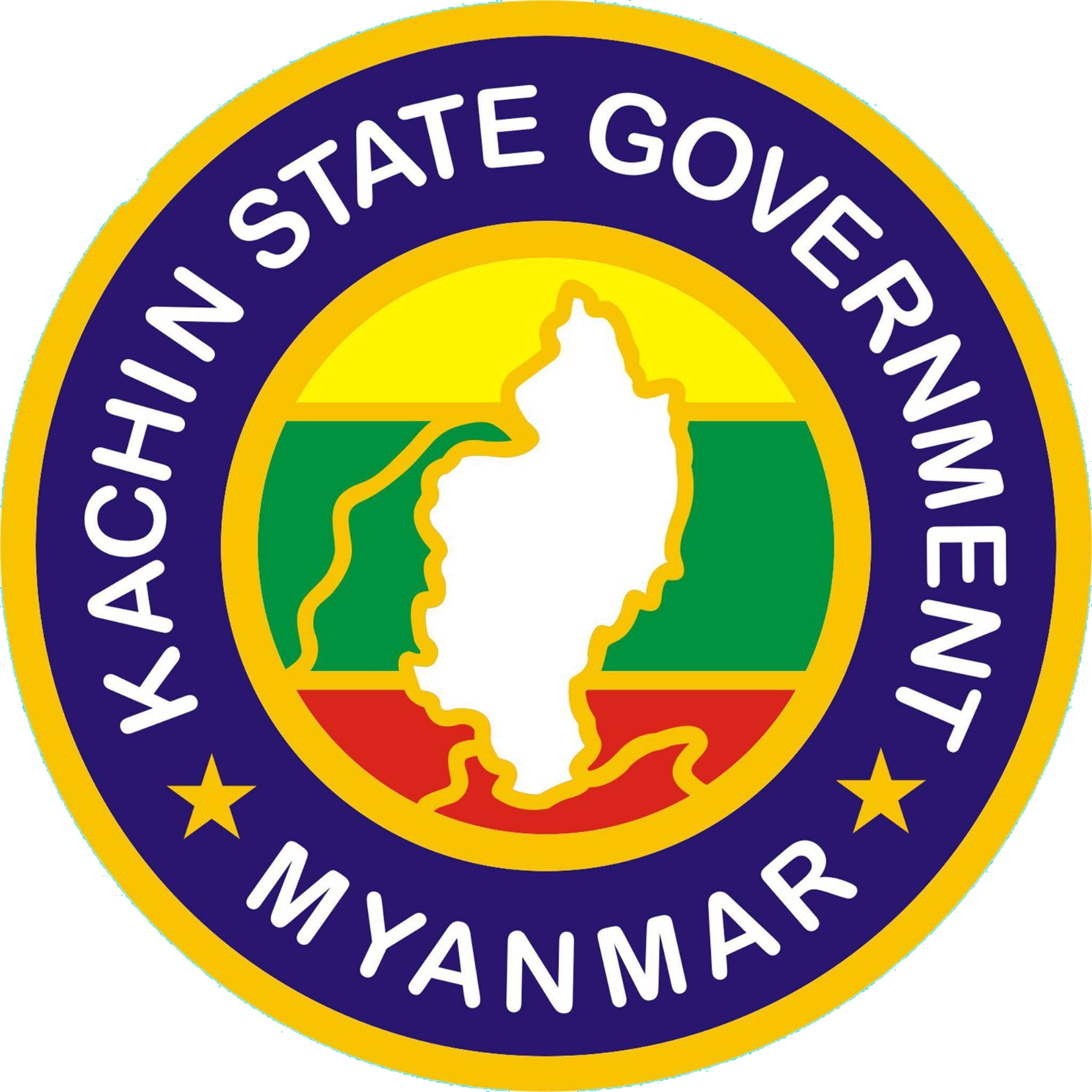
- Flag Seal

- Location of Kachin State in Myanmar
- Coordinates: 26°0′N 97°30′E
- Country: Myanmar
- Region: Upper
- Before becoming State: Part of Sagaing Division
- Establishment: 10 January 1948
- Capital: Myitkyina

Government
  - Chief Minister: Khet Htein Nan
  - Cabinet: Kachin State Government
  - Legislature: Kachin State Hluttaw
  - Judiciary: Kachin State High Court

Area
  - Total: 89,041.2 km^{2} (34,379.0 sq mi)
  - Rank: 3rd
- Highest elevation (Hkakabo Razi): 5,881 m (19,295 ft)

Population (2014)
  - Total: 1,689,441
  - Rank: 10th
  - Density: 18.9737/km^{2} (49.1417/sq mi)
- Demonym: Kachin

Demographics
  - Ethnicities: Jingpho; Khamti; Naga; Lisu; Han-Chinese; Shan; Bamar; Rakhine; Nu; Tibetan; Burmese Gurkha
  - Religions: Buddhism 64.0%; Christianity 33.8%; Islam 1.6%; Hinduism 0.4%; Mahayana Buddhism 0.1%
- Time zone: UTC+06:30 (MMT)
- ISO 3166 code: MM-11
- HDI (2015): 0.596 medium · 2nd

Kachin State (Burmese: ကချင်ပြည်နယ်; Kachin: Jinghpaw Mungdaw) is the northernmost state of Myanmar. It is bordered by China to the north and east (Tibet and Yunnan, respectively), Shan State to the south, and Sagaing Region and India (Arunachal Pradesh) to the west. It lies between north latitude 23° 27' and 28° 25' longitude 96° 0' and 98° 44'. The area of Kachin State is 89,041 km^{2} (34,379 sq mi). The capital of the state is Myitkyina. Other important towns include Bhamo, Mohnyin and Putao.

Kachin State has Myanmar's highest mountain, Hkakabo Razi at 5,889 metres (19,321 ft), forming the southern tip of the Himalayas, and a large inland lake, Indawgyi Lake. It also has three national parks, the most of any administrative division in Myanmar.

== History ==
=== Kingdom of Nanzhao ===
The Nanzhao Kingdom controlled much of Upper Burma, including modern-day Kachin State. The kingdom also used the territory as a staging ground to invade the Pyu city-states in modern-day Sagaing. E.R. Leach claimed that the Chinese referred to the Jingpo as Pu Man (蒲蠻) as a leftover from Nanzhao descriptions of Mon-Khmer speakers. However, there is little evidence to support this assertion.

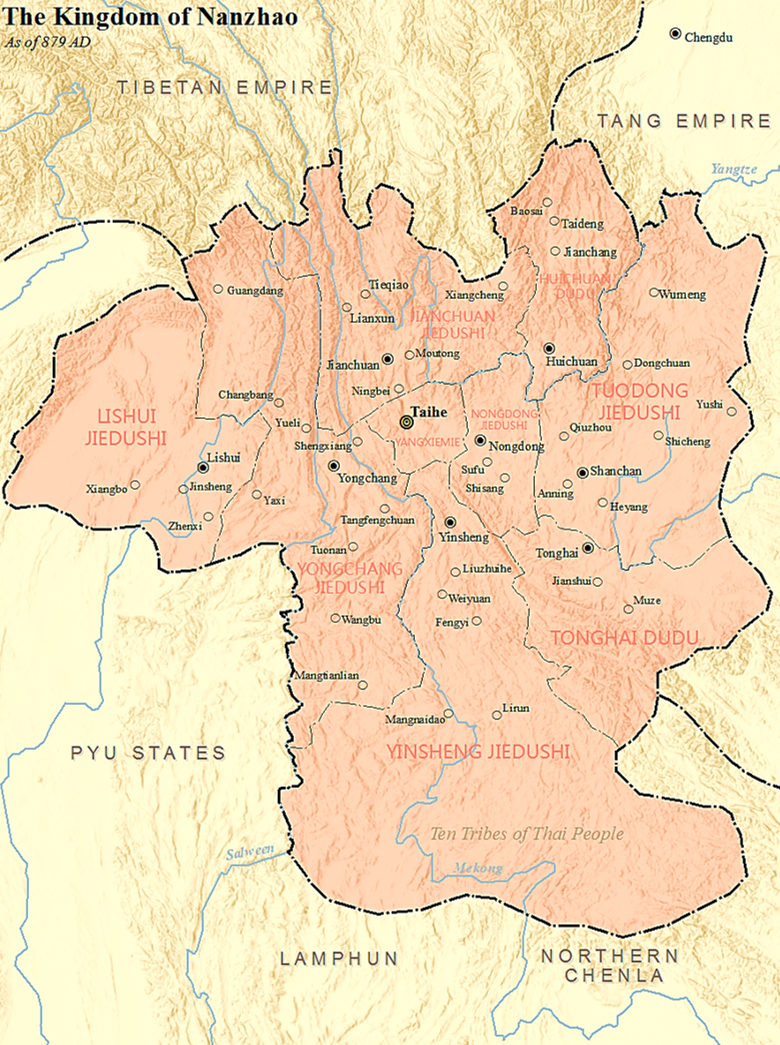
Kachin state was part of the Nanzhao kingdom in the 9th century CE

=== Kingdom of Dali ===
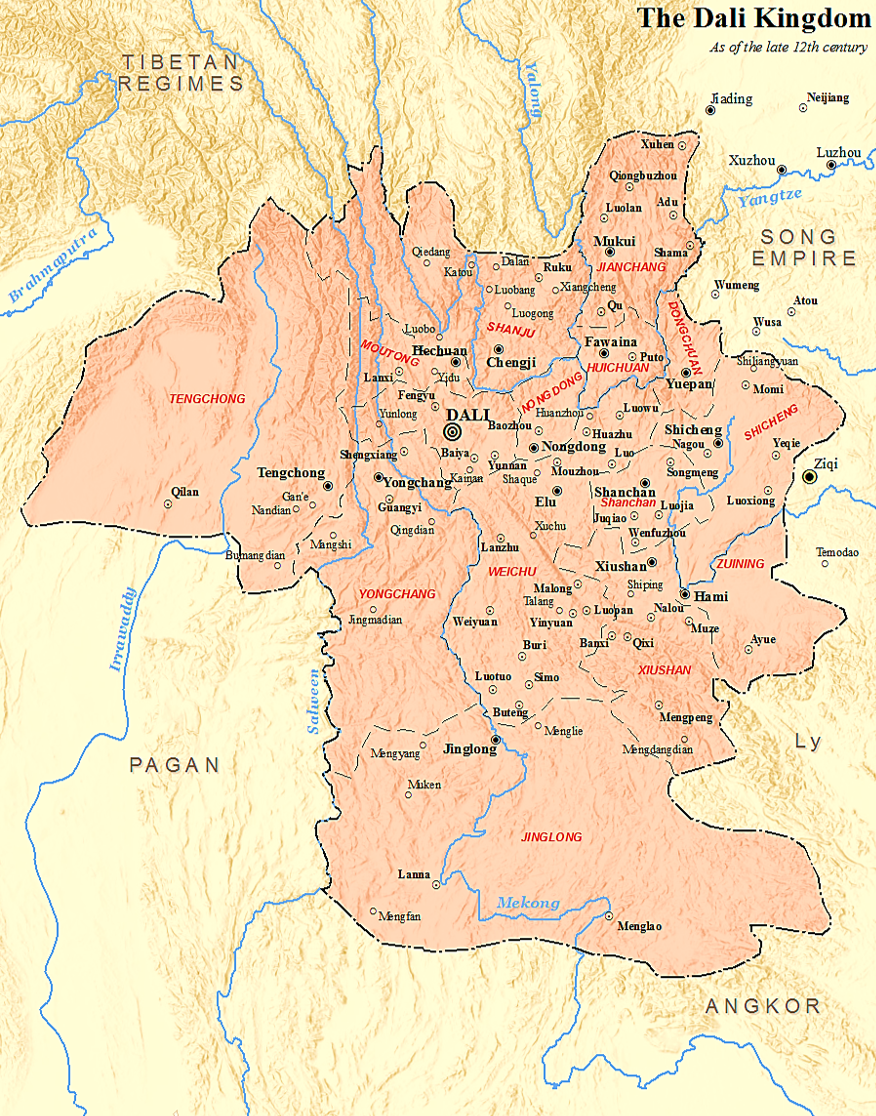
Kachin state was later part of the Dali Kingdom in the 12th century CE

After the fall of the Nanzhao Kingdom, the Dali Kingdom administered the lands inhabited by the Kachin people.

=== Kingdom of Möng Mao ===
Kachin state under Möng Mao (yellow) ruler Si Kefa in 1360 CE

During the 14th-century, Möng Mao used the territories of modern-day Kachin State to launch incursions into Yunnan.

=== Under Qing dynasty of China ===
The Qing dynasty in 1911

The Qing dynasty of China briefly controlled the present Kachin state during the 1760 Sino-Burmese War.

What is now Kachin State was historically inhabited by a diverse population of various ethnolinguistic groups, including the Rawang, the Lisu, the Jingpo, the Zaiwa, the Lashi/Lachik and the Lawngwaw/Maru, all of whom had overlapping territories and varying social structures. The term "Kachin" is a term given by the British during the colony period referring to ethnic groups living between the central Bamar heartland to the south and China to the north.

Traditional Kachin society was based on shifting hill agriculture. According to "The Political Systems of Highland Burma: A Study of Kachin Social Structure", written by E. R. Leach, Kachin was not a linguistic category. Political authority was based on chieftains who depended on support from immediate kinsmen. Considerable attention has been given by anthropologists of the Kachin custom of maternal cousin marriage, wherein it is permissible for a man to marry his mother's brother's daughter, but not with the father's sister's daughter. In pre-colonial times, the Kachin were animist.

After the 1760s Qing-Konbaung war, the Chinese exercised a degree of control over the present-day northeastern Kachin State. During the British colonization of Burma, the Kachin Hills tribal autonomy was accepted by the British government. British forces carried out two expeditions against the Kachin in 1892 and 1896. In 1910, the British occupied Hpimaw (Pianma) in the Pianma Incident.

=== Post-independence Burma ===
The pre-independence Burmese government under Aung San reached the Panglong Agreement with the Shan, Kachin, and Chin peoples on 12 February 1947. The agreement accepted "Full autonomy in internal administration for the Frontier Areas" in principle and envisioned the creation of a Kachin State by the Constituent Assembly. Burma attained independence on 4 January 1948. Kachin State was formed in the same year out of the former British Burma civil districts of Bhamo and Myitkyina, together with the larger northern district of Puta-o. Kachin State was officially announced on 10 January 1948 and Kachin State Government held "Mungdaw Masat Masat Manau" (forming of Kachin State Manau) for three consecutive days since 9 to 11 January as happiness since that year they held Manau on 10 January every year until the 1962 Burmese coup d'état. The vast mountainous hinterlands are predominantly Kachin, whereas the more densely populated railway corridor and southern valleys are mostly Shan and Bamar. The northern frontier was not demarcated until the 1960s. Various Chinese governments had claimed the northern-half of Kachin State as Chinese territory since the 18th century. Before the British rule, roughly 75% of all Kachin jadeite ended up in China, where it was prized much more highly than the local Chinese nephrite.

=== Kachin conflict ===
The complex political situation started when the Kachin armed group was established on 25 October 1960, after the U Nu government announced the state religion as Buddhism, as the Kachin people stopped believing in the government administration system, established after the federal union was agreed upon in the 1947 Panglong agreement. Between 1962 and 2010, the military government ruled over Myanmar. Cease fire agreements between ethnic armed groups and the government were made starting in 1989. And then in 2011 the new government led by President Thein Sein, broke the cease fire agreement which was agreed upon by the former military government and the Kachin ethnic armed group in 1994, resuming fighting against the Kachin who are living in the northern part of Myanmar, northern part of Shan, near the China border on 9 June 2011. Because of the abrupt internal conflict, thousands of internally displaced people fled to refugee camps which are located in the government-controlled area as well in the Kachin Independence Army controlled area (Hlaing, 2005).

Kachin troops formerly formed a significant part of the Burmese army. With the unilateral abrogation of the Union of Burma constitution by the Ne Win regime in 1962, Kachin forces withdrew and formed the Kachin Independence Army (KIA) under the Kachin Independence Organization (KIO). Aside from the major towns and railway corridor, Kachin State has been virtually independent from the mid-1960s through 1994, with an economy based on agriculture and trade with China, including of jade. After a Myanmar army offensive in 1994 seized the jade mines from the KIO, a peace treaty was signed, permitting continued KIO effective control of most of the State, under aegis of the Myanmar military. This ceasefire immediately resulted in the creation of numerous splinter factions from the KIO and KIA of groups opposed to the SPDC's controversial peace accord, and the political landscape remains highly unstable.

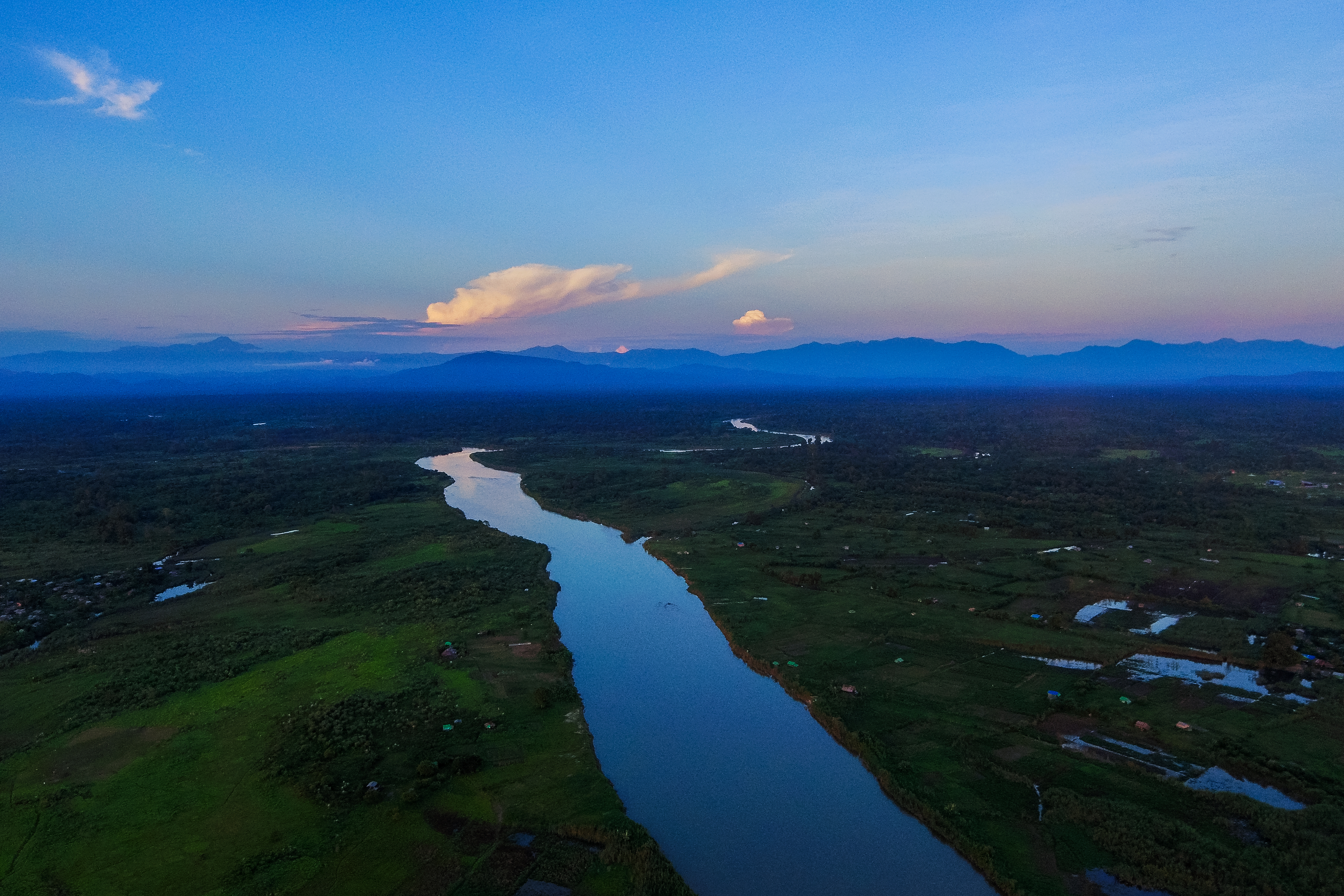
Hukaung Valley, Kachin State

KIO made a ceasefire agreement with the military government in 1994 while leaving political issues to be discussed with the next elected government. Throughout its struggle, both in the ceasefire and non-ceasefire period, KIO also made agreements with other ethnic rebels and alliances including the Democratic Alliance of Burma (DAB), the National Democratic Front (NDF), and United Nationalities Federal Council (UNFC). The main goal was to pressure the military government and restore the federal democratic government with greater autonomy to Kachin State. During its 17 years of ceasefire from 1994 to 2011 the KIO actively participated in the military-led constitution-drafting-process, attending the National Convention, which was boycotted by the democratic icon Aung San Suu Kyi's National League for Democracy and ethnic political parties. The KIO together with 12 other ethnic groups demanded amendments of the draft to be more in line with a federal democratic system and to give autonomy to states (Zaw Oo & Win Min 2007).

The seventeen-year ceasefire broke down and fighting between the Kachin Independence Organization and the government resumed in June 2011 after the Kachin Independent Army disallowed the government's order to transform into a Border Guard Force and it claimed that the regime's 2008 Constitution lacked federal democratic principles and equal political rights for ethnic minorities based on the Panglong Agreement. Renewed fighting between the Kachin Independence Army and the Burmese army began on 9 June 2011 at Ta-pein hydropower plan and continued throughout 2012. Initial reports suggested that from June to September 2011 a total of 5,580 Internally Displaced Persons from 1,397 households arrived at 38 IDP camps under Myanmar Government control. In August 2012 thousands of Kachin refugees were forced by the Chinese Government back into Myanmar despite the continued fighting there; NGOs like Human Rights Watch called to cease such action and pointed the illegality of doing so under international law. As of 9 October 2012, over 100,000 IDPs are taking shelter in various camps across Kachin State. The majority of IDPs (est. 70,000) are currently sheltering in KIA controlled territory. Fatality estimates were difficult to estimate but most reports suggested that between government troops, Kachin Independence Army rebels, and civilians upwards of 1,000 people had died in the conflict.

Even though many Kachins were already displaced internally, only around 150,000 people are reported as IDPs. The Kachins are currently the major target for the Burmese government, yet relatively few Kachins have chosen to resettle in countries such as the United States or Australia, in comparison to other Myanmar ethnic minorities, such as the Karens and Chins.

== Government ==
The four districts of Kachin State

The Kachin State Government consists of an executive (Kachin State Government), a legislature (Kachin State Hluttaw), and a judiciary.

== Demographics ==
In 2014, Kachin State had a population of 1,689,441.

Historical population
Year	Pop.	±%
1973	737,939	—
1983	904,794	+22.6%
2014	1,689,441	+86.7%
Source: 2014 Myanmar Census

=== Ethnic makeup ===
Ethnic composition of Kachin State
Ethnic group	Percentage
Kachin	39.6%
Bamar	32.6%
Shan	22.6%
Other	4.3%
Rakhine	0.4%
Karen	0.3%
Chin	0.2%
Source: 2019 GAD township reports

The Kachin make up a slight plurality of Kachin State's population, while the Bamar and Shan comprise significant minorities, making up almost half of the state's population.

After the 2014 Census in Myanmar, the Burmese government indefinitely withheld release of detailed ethnicity data, citing concerns around political and social concerns surrounding the issue of ethnicity in Myanmar. In 2022, researchers published an analysis of the General Administration Department's nationwide 2018-2019 township reports to tabulate the ethnic makeup of the Kachin State.

Change in ethnic makeup in Kachin State
Ethnic group	2019	2016	1983	1973
Kachin	39.6	–	38.1	39.1
Bamar	32.6	29.2	29.3	24.2
Shan	22.6	23.6	24.2	26.6
Jingphaw	–	18.97	–	–
Lisu	–	7.0	–	–
Rawam	–	5.0	–	–
Lawwaw	–	3.33	–	–
Lacheik	–	2.89	–	–
Zaikwa	–	1.57	–	–
Others	4.3	8.56	7.2	1.9
Rakhine / Arakanese	0.4	–	0.2	0.1
Kayin / Karen	0.3	–	0.3	0.3
Chin	0.2	–	0.7	0.8

=== Religion ===
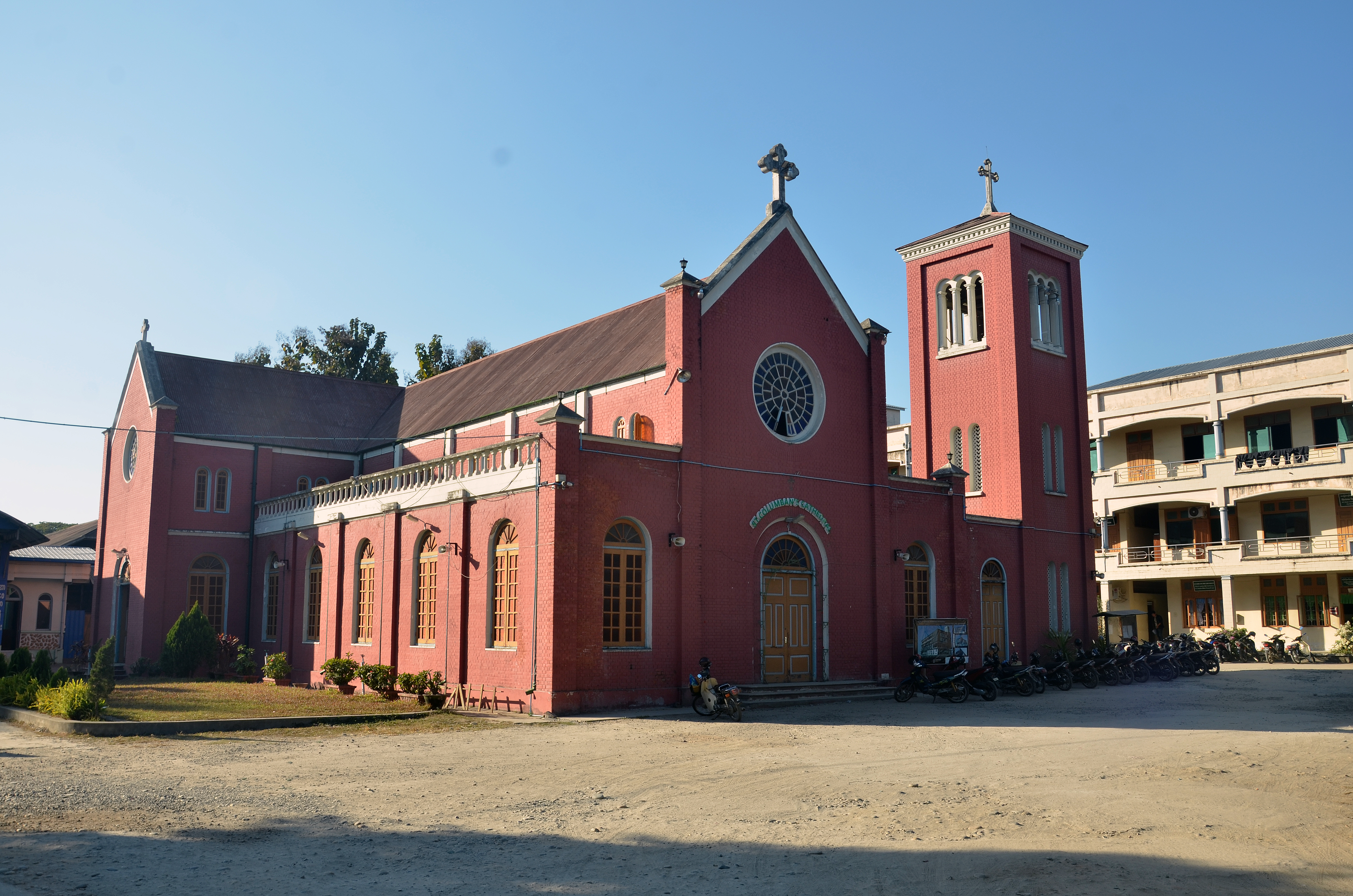
St. Columban's Catholic Cathedral, in Myitkyina, Kachin State

According to the 2014 Myanmar Census, Buddhists, who make up 64.0% of Kachin State's population, form the largest religious community there. Religious minority communities include Christians (33.8%), Muslims (1.6%), Hindus (0.4%), and animists (0.2%) who collectively comprise the remainder of Kachin State's population. 2.8% of the population listed no religion, other religions, or were otherwise not enumerated.

Religious group	Population % 1983	Population % 2015
Buddhism	58.5%	64.0%
Christianity	38.5%	33.8%
Hinduism	1.8%	0.4%
Islam	0.5%	1.6%
Other	0.7%	0.2%

According to the State Sangha Maha Nayaka Committee's 2016 statistics, 7,966 Buddhist monks were registered in Kachin State, comprising 1.5% of Myanmar's total Sangha membership, which includes both novice samanera and fully-ordained bhikkhu. The majority of monks belong to the Thudhamma Nikaya (95.3%), followed by the Shwegyin Nikaya (4.7%), with the remainder of monks belonging to other small monastic orders. 1,103 thilashin were registered in Kachin State, comprising 1.8% of Myanmar's total thilashin community.

=== Language ===
Burmese and Jingpho are lingua francas of Kachin State. Since Burma achieved independence in 1948, significant numbers of Burmese speakers have settled in Kachin State, which has accelerated a language shift from Jingpho to Burmese. Other Kachin tribes speak and write their own language: the Zaiwa, the Rawang, and the Lisu, who speak both the Lisu language and the Lipo language. English is also widely spoken as a working language.

== Economy ==
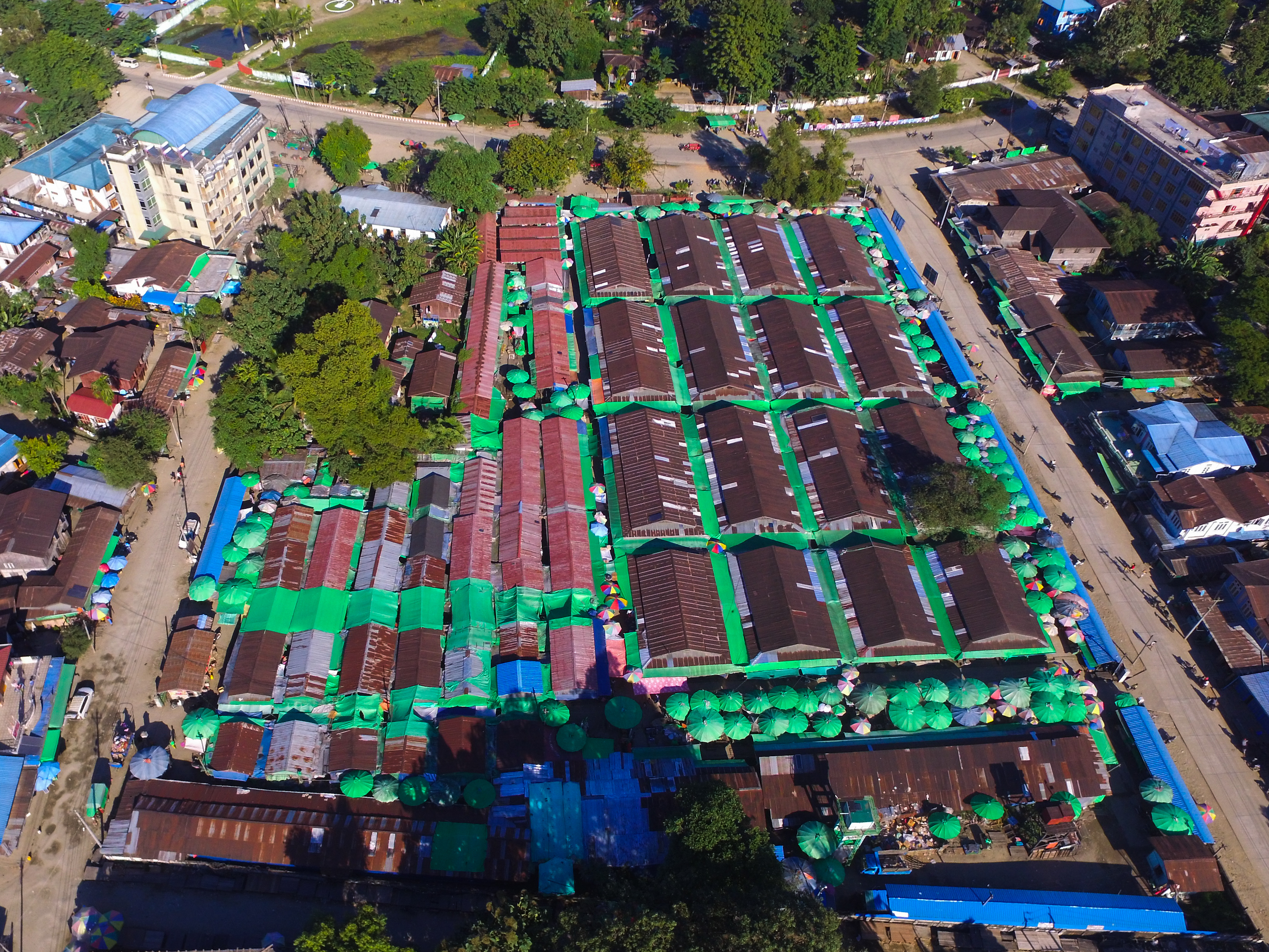
Tanai Market

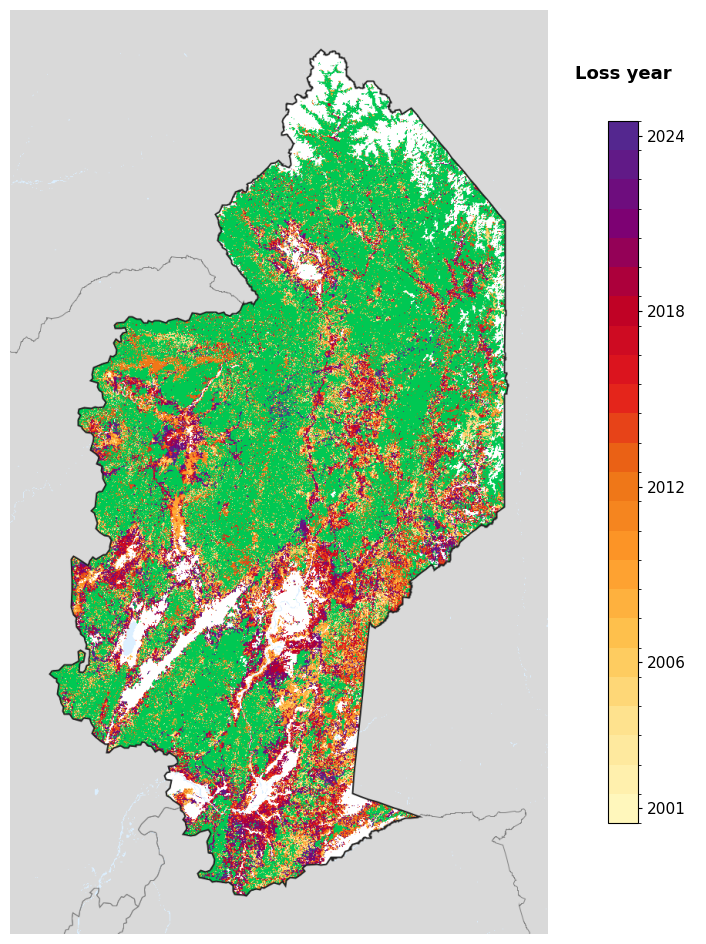
Tree-cover loss year in Kachin State, 2001-2024, from the Global Forest Change dataset.

The economy of Kachin State is predominantly agricultural. The main products include rice, teak, sugarcane, opium. Mineral products include gold, jade, and rare-earth elements. Hpakant is well known for its jade mines. Bhamo is one of the border trading points between China and Myanmar. A significant amount of legal and illegal cross-border trade along the China–Myanmar border passes through Kachin State, through border posts operated by both the central government (e.g., Lweje) and ethnic armed organisations (e.g., Laiza and Kanpaikti).

=== Jade mining ===
Over 600 tons of jade stones, which were unearthed from Lone-Khin area in Hpakant Township in Kachin State, had been displayed in Myanmar Naypyidaw to be sold in November 2011. Most of the jade stones extracted in Myanmar, 25,795 tons in 2009–10 and 32,921 tons in 2008–09, are from Kachin State. The largest jade stone in the world, 3000 tons, 21 metres long, 4.8 metres wide and 10.5 metres high was found in Hpakant in 2000. The Myanmar government pays little attention to the deterioration of environment in Kachin because of jade mining. There has been erosion, flooding and mudslides. Several houses are destroyed every year.

=== Hydropower ===
In 2006, the Prime Minister General Thein Sein made an agreement with the China Power Investment Cooperation in Beijing to build seven dams in Kachin State. The controversial construction project of a huge 1,055 megawatt hydroelectric power plant dam, the Myitsone Dam, is ongoing. It is funded by China Power Investment Cooperation. When completed, the dam will measure 152 metres high and the electricity produced will be sold to China. This project displaced about 15,000 people and is one of 7 projects planned for the Irrawaddy River.

=== Rare earth mining ===
Kachin State is the world's largest source of rare earths, which are critical in the supply chains of many multinational corporations, including Tesla and General Motors. In 2021, China imported US$200 million of rare earths from Myanmar in December 2021, exceeding 20,000 tonnes. Rare earths were discovered near Pang War in Chipwi Township in the late 2010s.

As China has shut down domestic mines due to the severe environmental impact, it has largely outsourced rare earth mining to Kachin State. Chinese companies and miners illegally set up operations in Kachin State without government permits, and instead circumvent the central government by working with a Border Guard Force militia under the Tatmadaw, formerly known as the New Democratic Army – Kachin, which has profited from this extractive industry. Mining operations also began in areas controlled by the Kachin Independence Organisation in 2022.

Rare earth mining has contaminated and polluted the local environment, including waterways and forests, and eroded mountainous landscapes, and impacted the health of locals. Since the 2021 Myanmar coup d'état, mining of rare earths in Kachin State has accelerated, due to lack of proper oversight. Land has also been seized from locals to conduct mining operations. As of March 2022, 2,700 mining collection pools scattered across 300 separate locations were found in Kachin State, encompassing the area of Singapore, and an exponential increase from 2016.

== Transportation ==
Kachin State is served by the following airports:

- Bhamo Airport
- Myitkyina Airport
- Putao Airport

There is a railroad between Myitkyina and Mandalay (through Sagaing). The train takes 21–30 hours from Mandalay to Myitkyina.

== Education ==
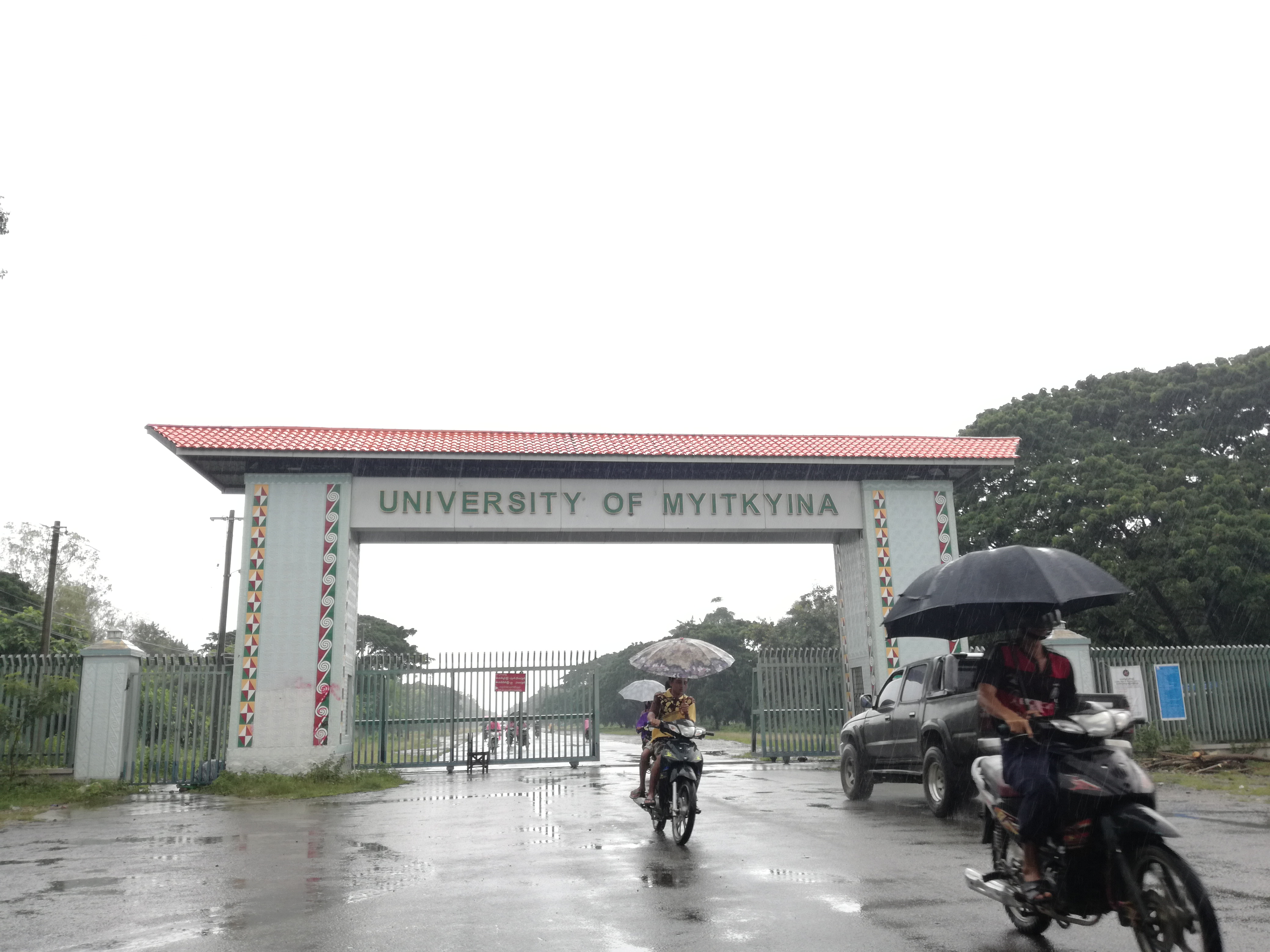
University of Myitkyina, Kachin State

Educational opportunities in Myanmar are extremely limited outside the main cities of Yangon and Mandalay. It is especially a problem in Kachin State where over 60 years of fighting between the government and insurgents has displaced thousands of people. The following is a summary of the education system in the state.

AY 2002–2003	Primary	Middle	High
Schools	1183	86	41
Teachers	3700	1500	600
Students	168,000	80,000	24,100

== Health care ==
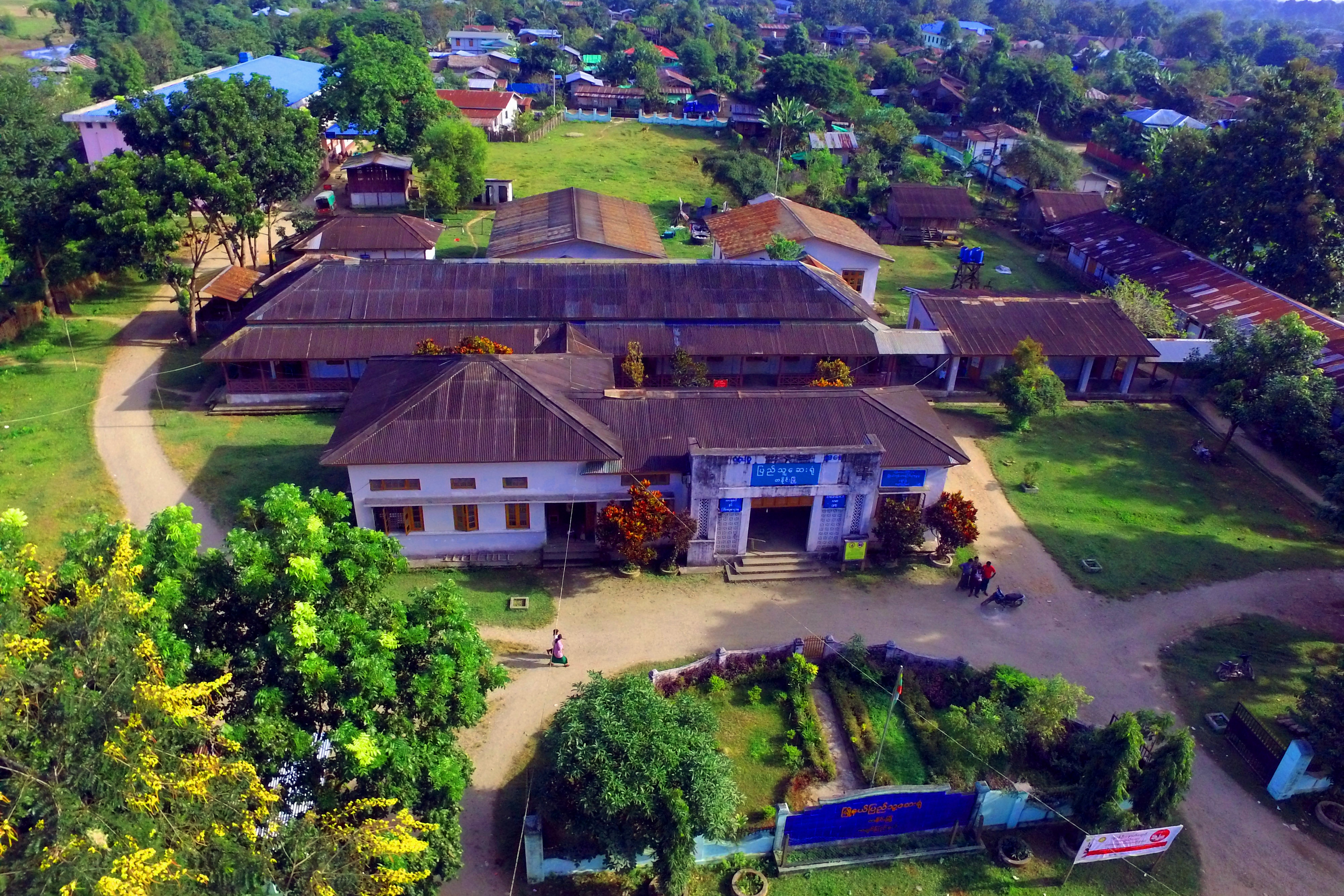
Tanai Hospital

The general state of health care in Myanmar is poor. The military government spends anywhere from 0.5% to 3% of the country's GDP on health care, consistently ranking among the lowest in the world. Although health care is nominally free, in reality, patients have to pay for medicine and treatment, even in public clinics and hospitals. Public hospitals lack many of the basic facilities and equipment. In general, the health care infrastructure outside of Yangon and Mandalay is extremely poor but is especially worse in remote areas like Kachin State. The following is a summary of the public health care system in the state.

2002–2003	# Hospitals	# Beds
Specialist hospitals	2	125
General hospitals with specialist services	2	500
General hospitals	17	553
Health clinics	22	352
Total	43	1530

== See also ==
- Kachin Hills
- Kachin State Cultural Museum
- Kumon Bum Mountains
- Myitsone Dam
- Myitkyina University
- Mohnyin University
