= Dimaluo =

Coordinates: 27°56′20″N 98°42′02″E

Dimaluo 迪麻洛村
- Village
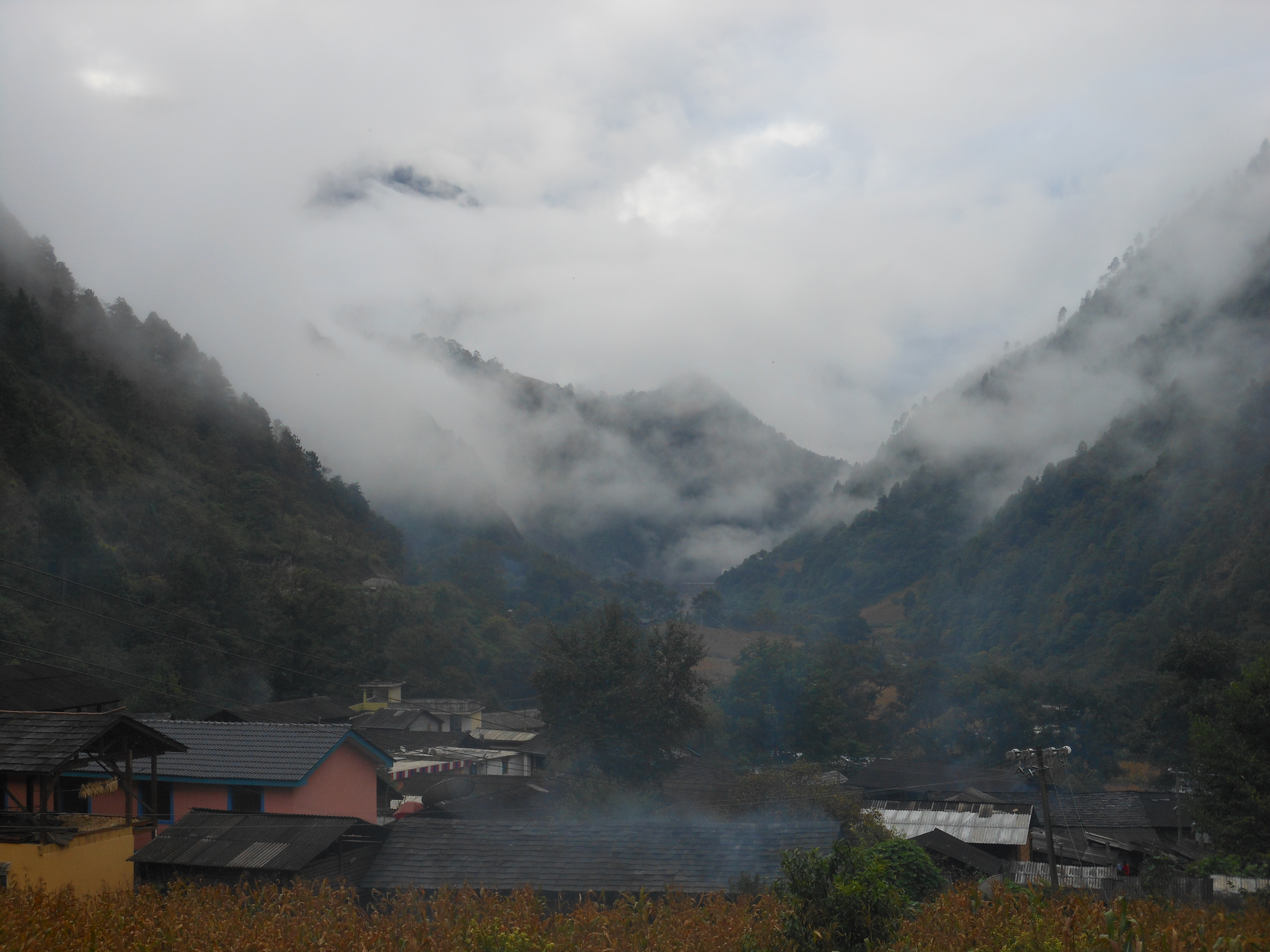
- Interactive map of Dimaluo
- Country: China
- Province: Yunnan
- Autonomous Prefecture: Nujiang Lisu
- Autonomous County: Gongshan Derung and Nu
- Township: Pengdang Township

Dimaluo (Chinese: 迪麻洛村; pinyin: Dímáluò Cūn) is a village in Gongshan Derung and Nu Autonomous County located in a side valley of the Nu River Valley in the north-western part of Yunnan, China. The Dimaluo River flows through the village and is a tributary of the nearby Nu River.

== Etymology ==
"Dimaluo" is a Lisu word meaning "plains".

== History ==
French Catholic missionaries first arrived in Dimaluo during the 1840's, and later on, Swiss and French missionaries from the Paris Foreign Missions Society would continue converting the area. They had been successful in making a number of Nu converts in the Dimaluo area. Because there was no written Nu language, instructions took place in Tibetan, giving rise to Tibetan as a language of high status among converted communities.

Electricity was introduced to the village in 2008, and a hydroelectric dam has been built along the Dimaluo River.

In recent years, large numbers of Han Chinese workers have moved to the area for employment in construction jobs, which largely involves building infrastructure in the region.

== Geography and Climate ==
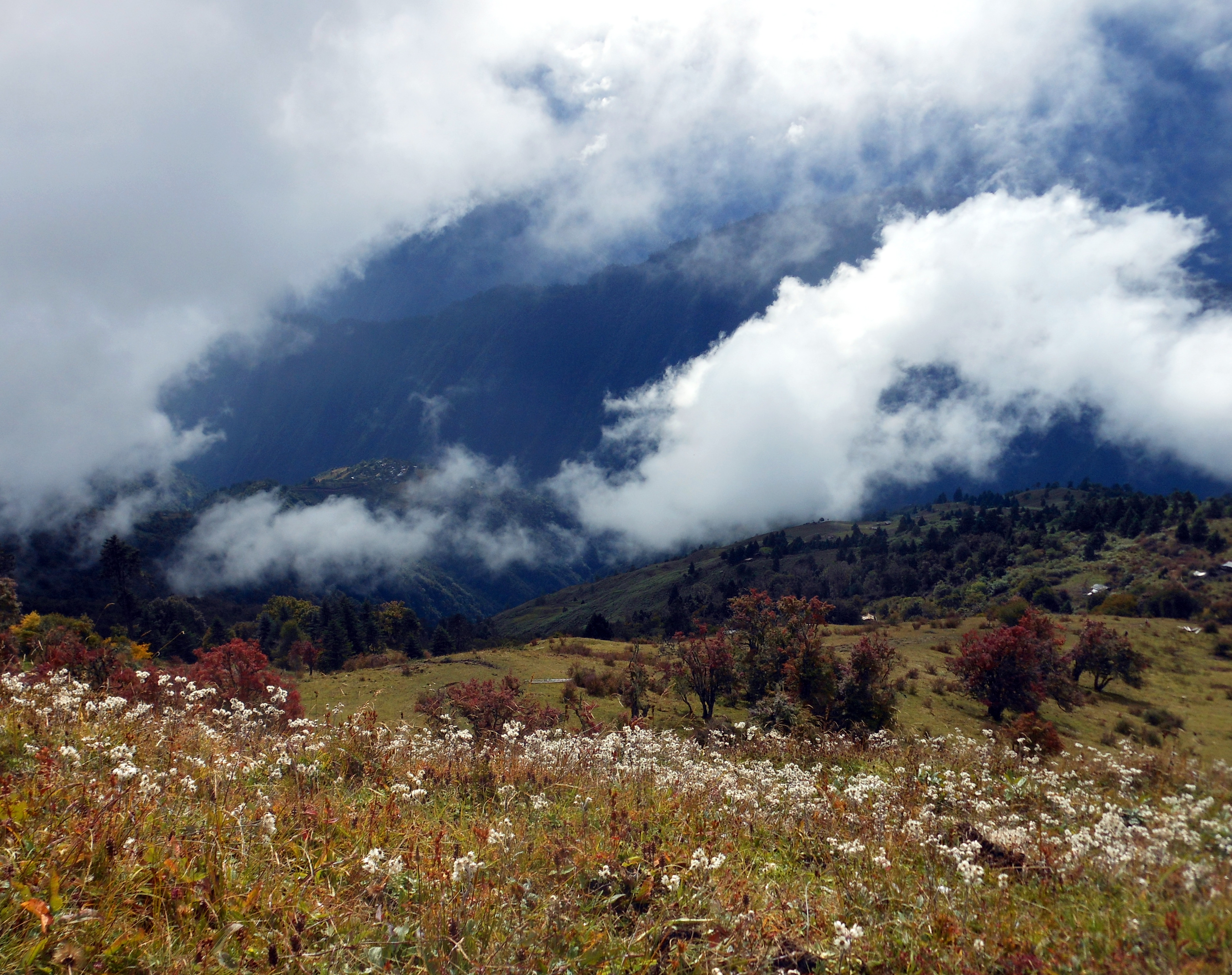
Dimaluo River Valley.

Dimaluo is located at an altitude of approximately 1,815 metres (5,955 ft) above sea level. It is bisected by the Dimaluo River which flows directly into the Nu River roughly 10 km downstream from Dimaluo village. The village sits in the Dimaluo River Valley and is surrounded by the steep valley walls. The valley's peaks reach a height of around 13,000 feet (4,000 m). The village is bordered by Myanmar's Kachin State to its west, and 12 miles north of the village lies the border with the Tibet Autonomous Region.

Dimaluo is located in a subtropical highland climate (Köppen Cwb), and, due to its high altitude, never gets very hot in summer. The rainy season is typically from June through September and receives its first snowfall in early November.

== Economy ==
The economy of Dimaluo primarily consists of agriculture. Locals typically grow wheat or corn and raise livestock such as sheep, goats, and pigs. Due to the development of infrastructure in the village in recent years, Dimaluo received around 400 tourists per year as of 2018. Trekking through Dimaluo has become increasingly popular with tourists from China, with many following an ancient pilgrimage route linking the Nujiang Valley with a neighboring one. A couple of guesthouses have started up in Dimaluo and operate with some success, especially during the spring and fall months and during national holidays.

== Society and Culture ==
=== Religion ===
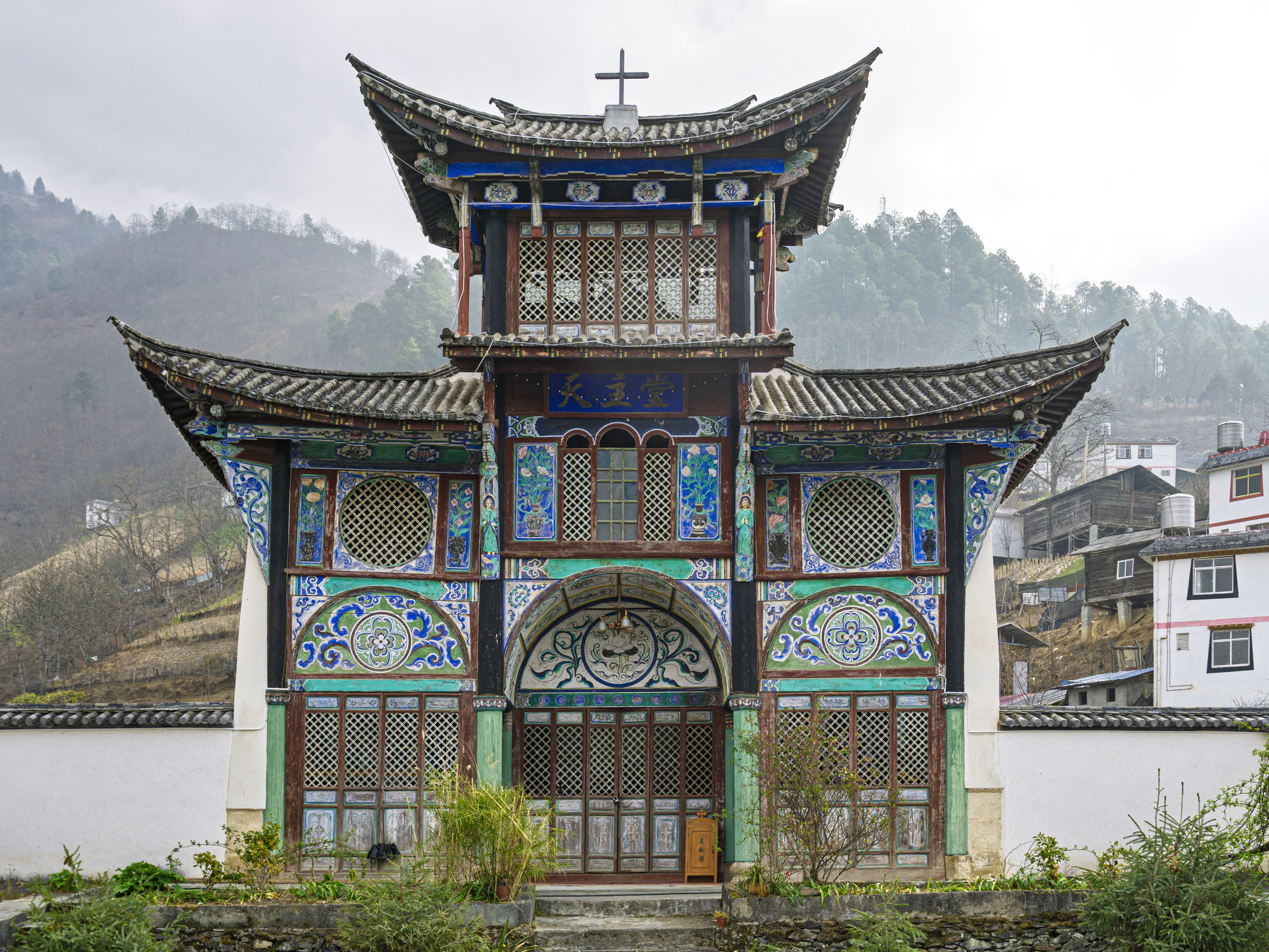
Sacred Heart Church in Dimaluo

Dimaluo is largely Catholic. Many in the village go to church on Saturday evenings and Sunday mornings. During Sunday morning services, churchgoers pray, sing, and chant in both Mandarin and Tibetan.

=== Ethnic groups ===
The village is a small enclave of Tibetan culture in a county that also contains people of Lisu, Nu, and Dulong descent. As the original population of the valley was predominantly Nu, many of the families here are now mixed Nu-Tibetan descent.

=== Language ===
Many of the people in Dimaluo speak Tibetan, Nu, and Lisu, and some can speak Derung. Tibetans do not actually form a majority of the village's population, but the dominant language and the public displays of culture (music, dance, and traditional dress) are all Tibetan. Most of the younger people also speak Mandarin, some with a Gongshan accent. Most of the people in the village have at least three names: a Tibetan one, an English (Catholic) one given to them at birth, and a Chinese one they were given when they started school – as well as whatever nicknames they have acquired along the way.

=== Sport and Leisure ===
Several nights per week, traditional Tibetan dancing takes place at the center of the village on the basketball court or in private homes which have rooms big enough to accommodate a crowd. Singing is usually divided up into men's and women's rounds, and takes place along with the dance and accompaniment by the men on the traditional two-stringed instrument called the xianzi.

Along with dancing, basketball is one of the most popular recreational activities in Dimaluo. The basketball court is at the very center of the village, and serves as a gathering place. Several of the local villages have teams, and may travel a two-hour walk to compete with other teams.

== See also ==
- Three Parallel Rivers of Yunnan Protected Areas – Unesco World Heritage Site
