= Nujiang =

Nujiang may refer to:

- Nujiang River, or Salween River, in China and Southeast Asia
- Nujiang Lisu Autonomous Prefecture, prefecture in Yunnan, China
- Nujiang, Tibet, a village in the Tibet Autonomous Region of China
