= Salix contortiapiculata =

Scientific classification
- Kingdom: Plantae
- Clade: Tracheophytes
- Clade: Angiosperms
- Clade: Eudicots
- Clade: Rosids
- Order: Malpighiales
- Family: Salicaceae
- Genus: Salix
- Species: S. contortiapiculata

Binomial name
- Salix contortiapiculata P.I Mao & W.Z.Li

Shrub in the genus of willows

Salix contortiapiculata is a tall shrub from the genus of willow (Salix) with 5 to 9 centimeter long leaf blades. The natural range of the species is in China.

== Description ==
Salix contortiapiculata is a shrub up to 4 meters high . The branches are dark purple-red and hairless. The buds are purple-red, broadly ovate, about 5 millimeters long, hairless and have a blunt tip. The leaves have a 0.6 to 1.4 centimeter long petiole, which is hairy rust brown on the upper side. The leaf blade is obovate-oblong, 5 to 9 inches long and 2.2 to 4.2 inches wide, with entire or sparsely toothed edges. The leaf base is broadly wedge-shaped or more or less rounded, the tip is twisted and pointed. The upper side of the leaf is green, glabrous or hairy near the base along the midrib, the underside is pale or slightly glaucous, initially shaggy hairy and later balding.

Male inflorescences are unknown. The female catkins are 5 to 7 inches long with a diameter of about 7 millimeters. The inflorescence stalk is 2.5 to 4 inches long and has three or four leaves. The inflorescence axis is finely hairy. The bracts are broadly elongated, about 2.5 millimeters long, on the underside and on the leaf margin loosely finely haired or almost hairless. The tip of the leaf is blunt-rounded or wavy-serrated. Female flowers have an adaxial lying nectar gland . The ovary is ovoid-conical, glabrous, sitting or near sitting. The stylus is about 1 millimeter long and bilobed. The scar is also bilobed. The fruits of Salix contortiapiculata ripen in July.

== Range ==
The natural range is in the Chinese province of Yunnan in the districts of Gongshan, Drungzu, Nuzu, and Zizhixian. Salix contortiapiculata grows near rivers in the mountains at altitudes of 1300 to 1900 meters.

== Taxonomy ==
Salix contortiapiculata is a species from the genus of willows ( Salix ) in the willow family (Salicaceae). There, it is the section Magnificae assigned. It was first scientifically described in only 1987 by Pin I Mao and Li Wen Zheng in the Acta Botanica Yunnanica. No synonyms are known. The generic name Salix comes from Latin and was already used by the Romans for various types of willow.

== Literature ==
- Wu Zheng-yi, Peter H. Raven (Ed.): Flora of China . Volume 4: Cycadaceae through Fagaceae . Science Press / Missouri Botanical Garden Press, Beijing / St. Louis 1999, ISBN 0-915279-70-3, pp. 192, 210 (English).
- Helmut Genaust: Etymological dictionary of botanical plant names. 3rd, completely revised and expanded edition. Nikol, Hamburg 2005, ISBN 3-937872-16-7, p. 552 (reprint from 1996).
