= Carex deciduisquama =

Scientific classification
- Kingdom: Plantae
- Clade: Tracheophytes
- Clade: Angiosperms
- Clade: Monocots
- Clade: Commelinids
- Order: Poales
- Family: Cyperaceae
- Genus: Carex
- Species: C. deciduisquama

Binomial name
- Carex deciduisquama F.T.Wang & Tang ex P.C.Li

Species of sedge

Carex deciduisquama is a tussock-forming perennial in the family Cyperaceae. It is endemic to the Gongshan area of the Yunnan province in south central China.

The sedge has a short rhizome and tufted smooth culms that have a triangular cross-section, a width of 3 mm (0.12 in) and typically grow to a height of about 1 m (3 ft 3 in). The flat and scaly leaves are found at the base of the plant growing directly from the stem and are 5 to 7 mm (0.20 to 0.28 in) in width and are often surrounded by brown fibrous sheaths.

== See also ==
- List of Carex species
