= Nujiang Lisu Autonomous Prefecture =

- Autonomous prefecture

Name transcription(s)
  - Chinese: 怒江傈僳族自治州
  - Lisu: ꓠꓳ-ꓟꓵ ꓡꓲ-ꓢꓴ ꓫꓵꓽ ꓚꓲꓸ ꓛꓬꓽ ꓗꓪꓼ ꓫꓵꓽ ꓝꓳꓴ
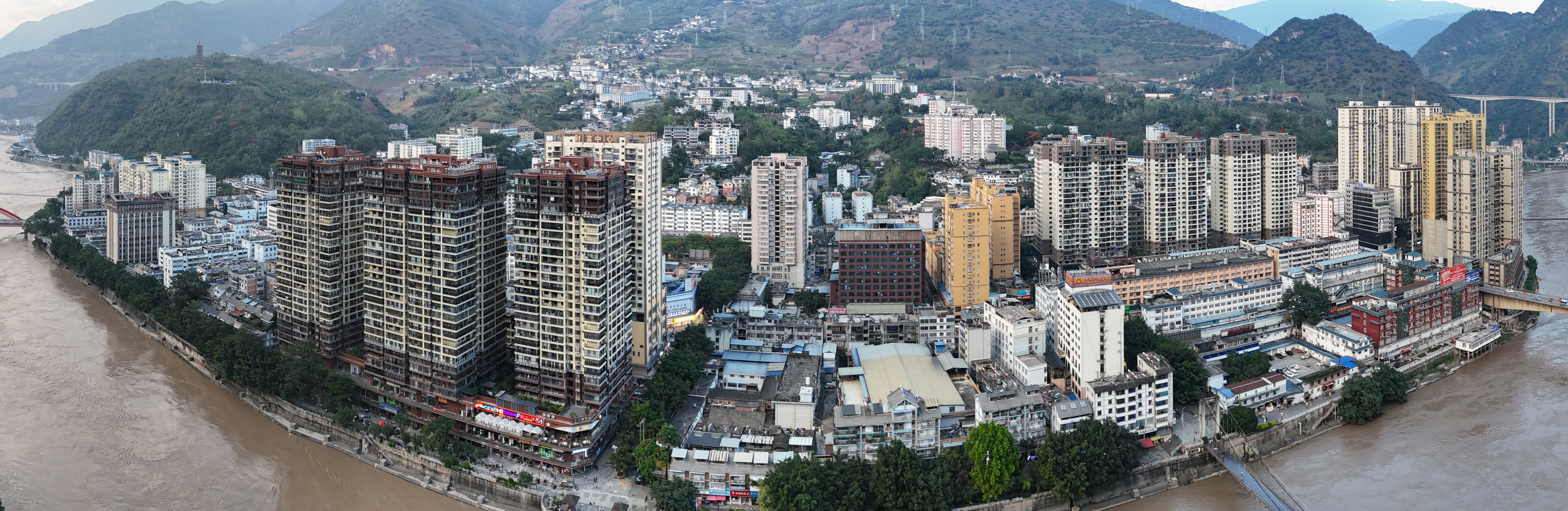
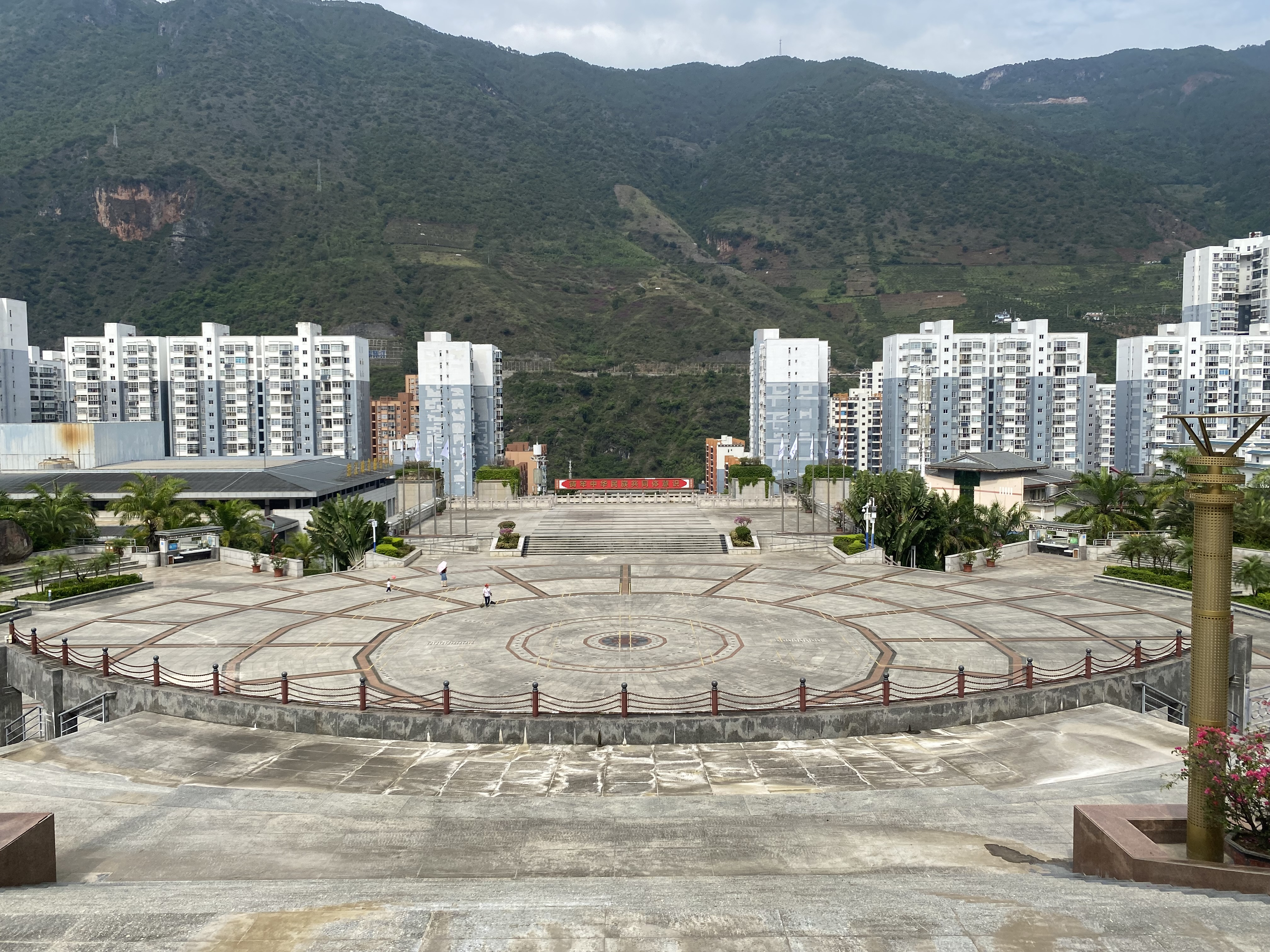
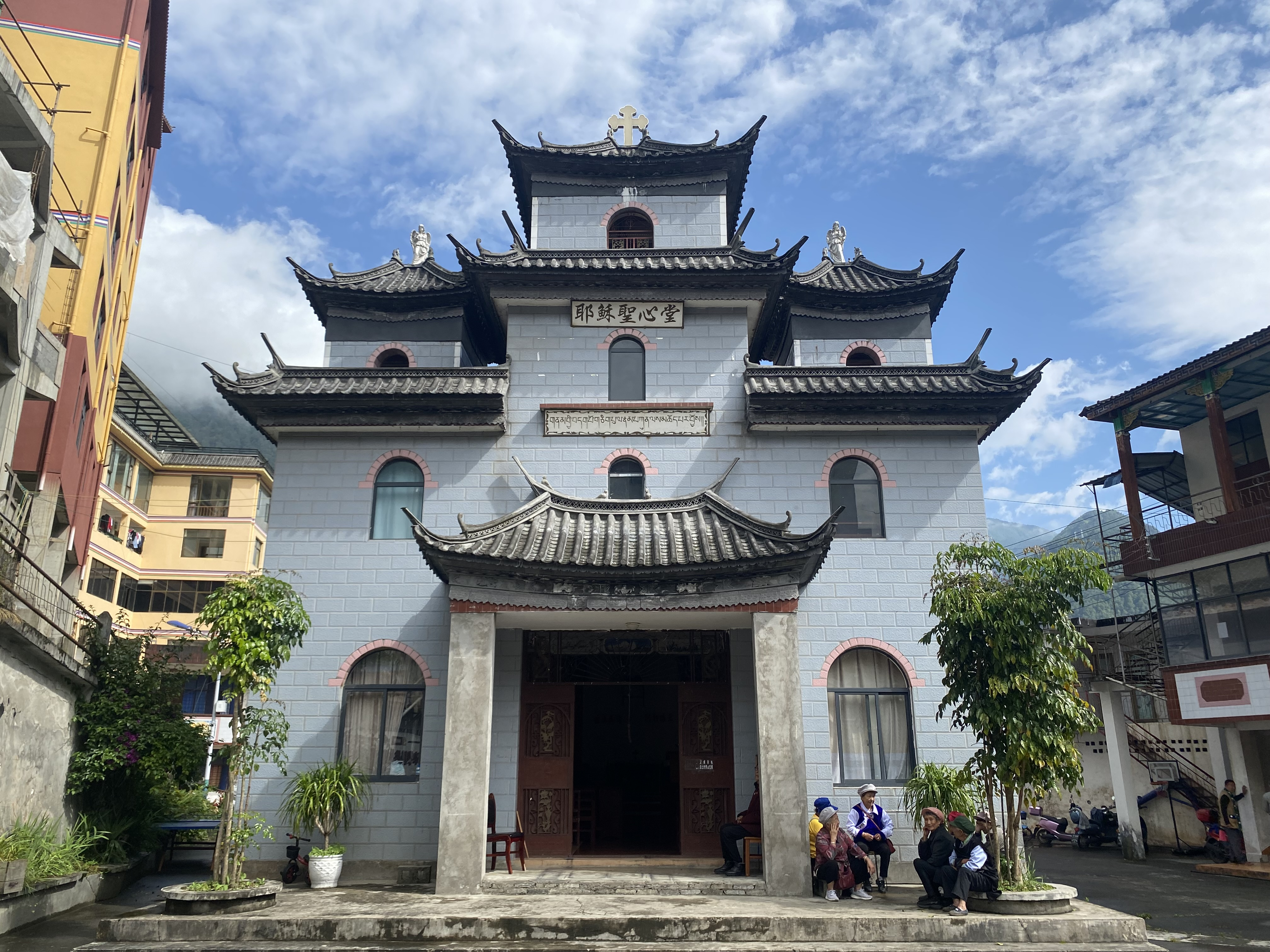
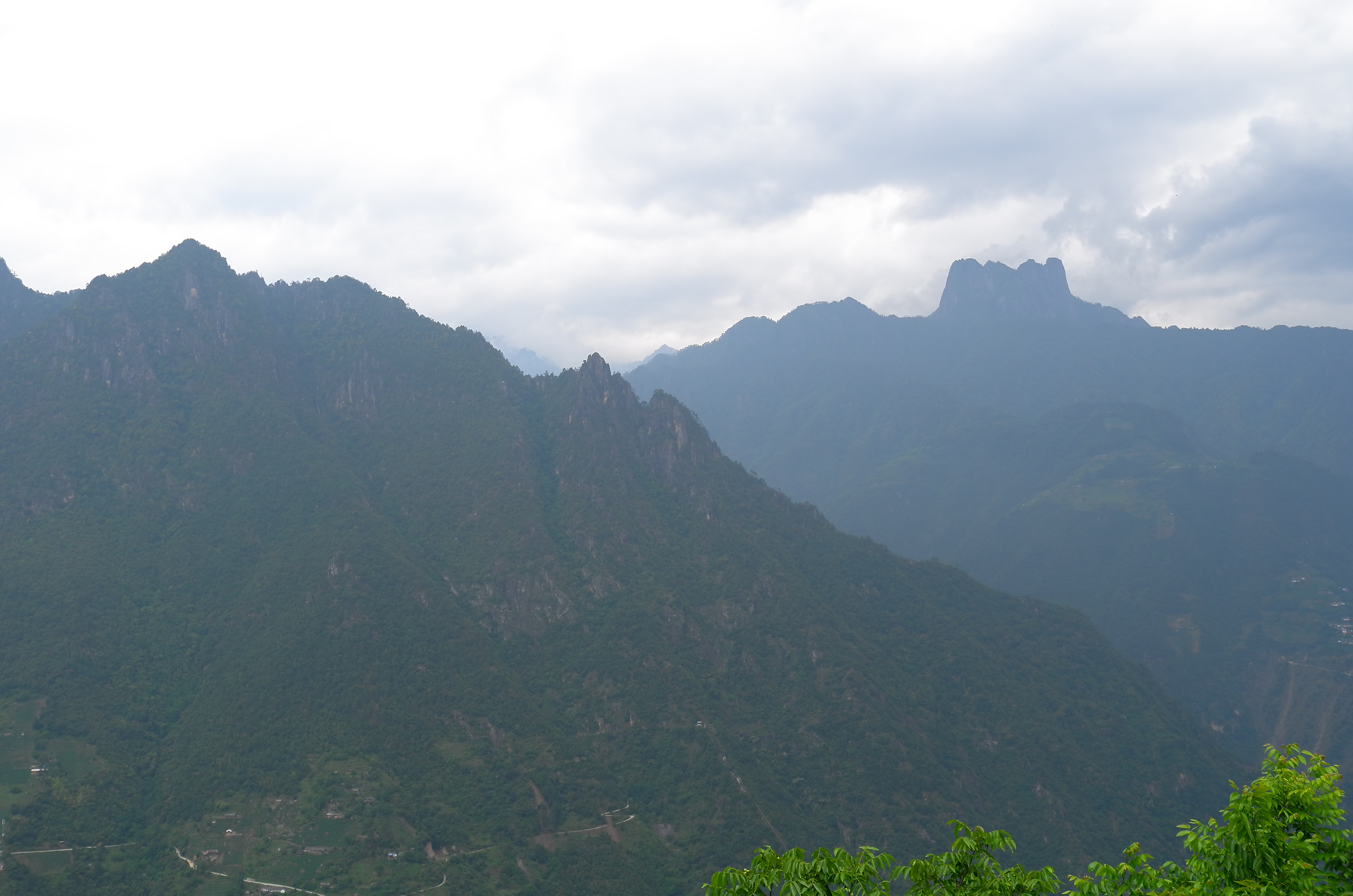
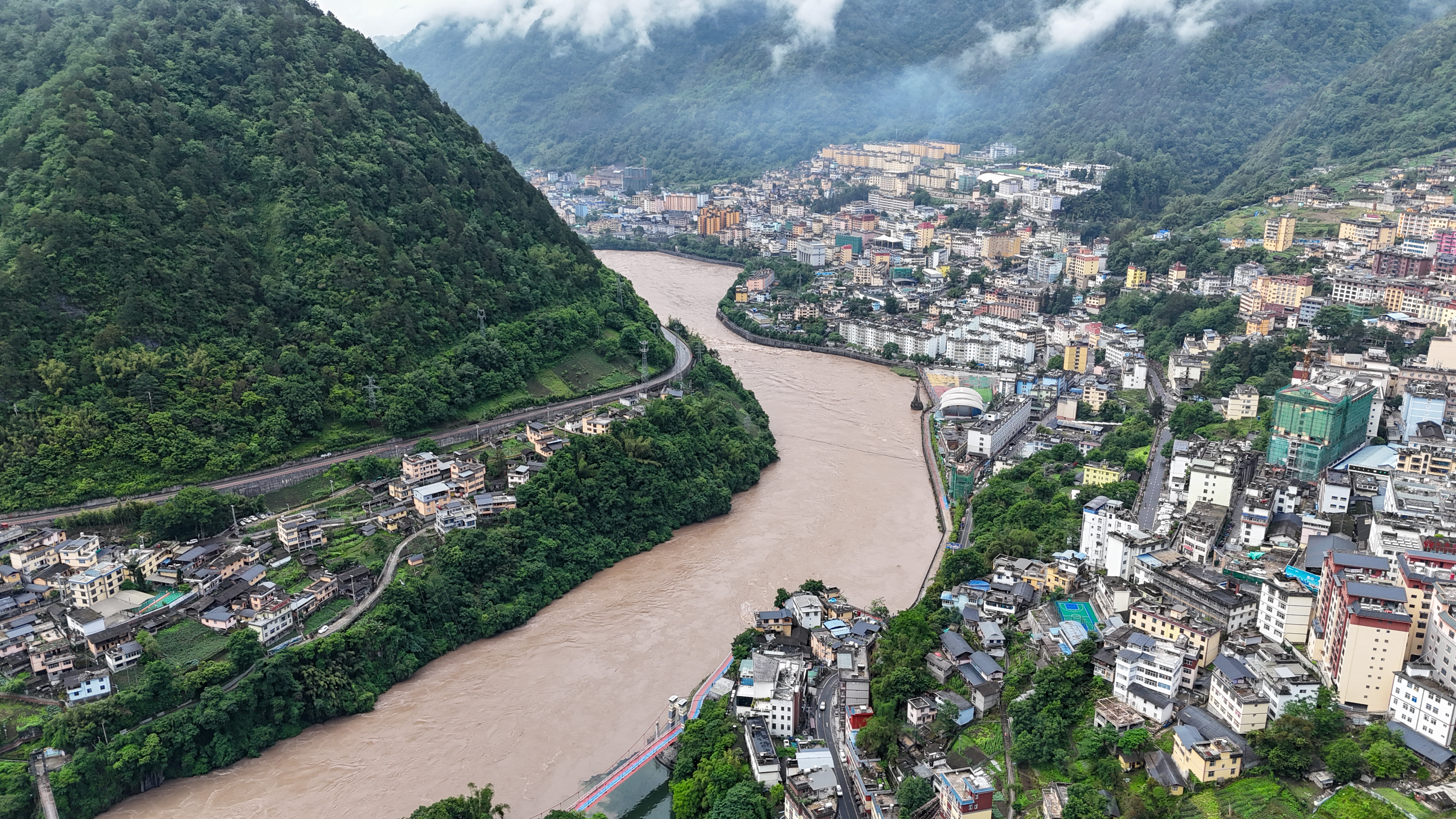
- Cityscape of Liuku, Lushui Tongxin Square Sacred Heart of Jesus Church, Cikai The Crown Peak in Gaoligong Mountains Nujiang River across Gongshan County

- Location of Nujiang Prefecture in Yunnan
- Coordinates (Nujiang Prefecture government): 25°49′03″N 98°51′24″E
- Country: People's Republic of China
- Province: Yunnan
- Prefecture seat: Lushui (Liuku)

Area
  - Total: 14,588.92 km^{2} (5,632.81 sq mi)

Population (2010)
  - Total: 534,337
  - Density: 36.6262/km^{2} (94.8615/sq mi)

GDP
  - Total: CN¥ 25.0 billion US$ 3.7 billion
  - Per capita: CN¥ 45,441; US$ 6,702
- Time zone: UTC+8 (China Standard)
- Postal code: 673100
- Area code: 0886
- ISO 3166 code: CN-YN-33
- License Plate Prefix: 云Q
- Website: www.nj.yn.gov.cn

Nujiang Lisu Autonomous Prefecture

Chinese name
- Chinese: 怒江傈僳族自治州
Transcriptions
Standard Mandarin
- Hanyu Pinyin: Nùjiāng Lìsùzú Zìzhìzhōu

Lisu name
- Lisu: ꓠꓳ-ꓟꓵ ꓡꓲ-ꓢꓴ ꓫꓵꓽ ꓚꓲꓸ ꓛꓬꓽ ꓗꓪꓼ ꓫꓵꓽ ꓝꓳꓴ

Nujiang Lisu Autonomous Prefecture (Note: Chinese: 怒江傈僳族自治州; pinyin: Nùjiāng Lìsùzú Zìzhìzhōu; Lisu: ꓠꓳ-ꓟꓵ ꓡꓲ-ꓢꓴ ꓫꓵꓽ ꓚꓲꓸ ꓛꓬꓽ ꓗꓪꓼ ꓫꓵꓽ ꓝꓳꓴ) is an autonomous prefecture in northwestern Yunnan, China. The eponymous ethnic group is the Lisu people, who make up nearly half of the prefecture's population.

The prefecture is long and narrow, with an area of 14,585 square kilometers and a total population of 552,700. By the end of 2024, the resident population of the prefecture was 532,000, including 293,000 in urban areas and 239,000 in rural areas. The capital of the prefecture is located in Liuku Town, Lushui City. Nujiang Prefecture is the only Lisu Autonomous Prefecture in China, with the Lisu ethnic group accounting for about 51% of the population, and a number of other ethnic minorities, including the Bai, Nu, Pumi and Dulong, living in the prefecture.

Economically, due to geographic constraints, the incidence of poverty in Nujiang was once as high as 56%, which is at a backward level in both China and Yunnan Province, and is one of the "Three Regions and Three Prefectures" in China that are extremely poor. Because of its location in the Hengduan Mountains, Nujiang has the natural wonder of "Three Parallel Rivers", which was inscribed on the UNESCO's World Natural Heritage List in 2003.

== Name ==
It is named after the Nujiang river (the longest undammed river in Southeast Asia) and the Lisu ethnic group.

== Administration ==
The seat of the prefecture is Liuku Town, Lushui.

The prefecture is subdivided into four county-level divisions: one county-level city, one county, and two autonomous counties:

Map
Name	Hanzi	Hanyu Pinyin	Population (2010 Census)	Area (km^{2})	Density (/km^{2})
Lushui	泸水市	Lúshuǐ Shì	184,835	2,938	62.91
Fugong County	福贡县	Fúgòng Xiàn	98,616	2,804	35.16
Gongshan Derung and Nu Autonomous County	贡山独龙族怒族自治县	Gòngshān Dúlóngzú Nùzú Zìzhìxiàn	37,894	4,506	8.40
Lanping Bai and Pumi Autonomous County	兰坪白族普米族自治县	Lánpíng Báizú Pǔmǐzú Zìzhìxiàn	212,992	4,455	47.80

== Demographics ==
According to the 2020 Census, Nujiang has 534,337 inhabitants with a population density of 33.45 inhabitants/km^{2}.

Ethnic groups in Nujiang, 2010 census
Nationality	Population	Percentage(%)
Lisu	280,179	50.69
Bai	138,191	25.00
Han	59,056	10.69
Nu	31,976	5.79
Pumi	17,491	3.16
Yi	11,758	2.34
Dulong	6,041	1.09
Zang	1,843	0.33
Naxi	1,529	0.28
Dai	695	0.13
Others	2,756	0.5
Total	551,515	

== Geography ==
The Nujiang Lisu Autonomous Prefecture borders the Kachin prefecture of Myanmar to the west, with a national border of 450 kilometers. It is bordered by Nyingchi (Linzhi) City of Tibet Autonomous Region in the north, Diqing Tibetan Autonomous Prefecture of Yunnan Province in the east and Dali Bai Autonomous Prefecture in the south. Located in the canyon area of the Hengduan Mountains, the Salween River (Nujiang) passes through from north to south, from which the name of the prefecture is derived. It forms part of the Three Parallel Rivers, a UNESCO World Heritage Site.

== Biodiversity ==
The prefecture gets its name from the Chinese part of the Salween River (known as the "Nujiang River" in Chinese). The Salween is the longest undammed river in Southeast Asia and boasts a high degree of biodiversity.

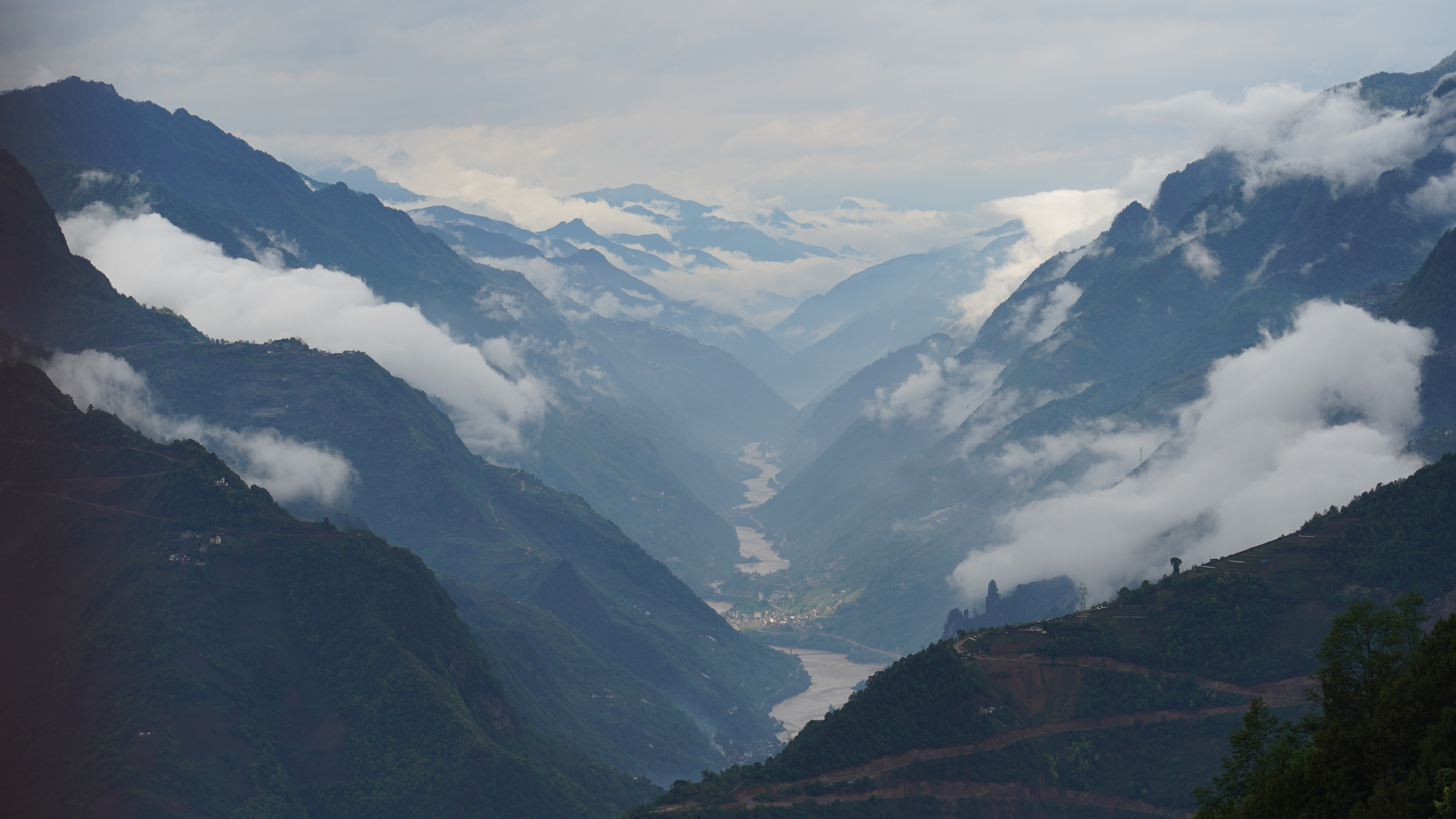
The Grand Canyon of the Nujiang River, Yunnan, China - May 2019

In terms of animals, there are 205 species of mammals in the Prefecture in 8 orders, 25 families, and 74 genera, accounting for 30.9% of the total number of mammals in China and 52% of the total number of mammals in Yunnan. There are 525 species (including subspecies) of birds, accounting for more than half of the total number of birds in Yunnan Province; there are 52 species of amphibians, accounting for 1/5 of the total number of birds in Yunnan Province; there are 76 species of reptiles, accounting for 1/3 of the total number of reptiles in Yunnan Province; there are 49 species and subspecies of fishes, and more than 1720 species of insects have been recorded in Nujiang Prefecture. More than 1720 species have been recorded.

In 2011 a new species of Snub-Nosed monkeys, named the Myanmar snub-nosed monkey (Rhinopithecus strykeri), was discovered in the Gaoligong Mountains, on the border area of the Nujiang Prefecture and Myanmar.
