= Fugong County =

Fugong County 福贡县 · ꓩꓴꓽ-ꓗꓳꓹ ꓫꓯꓹ
- County
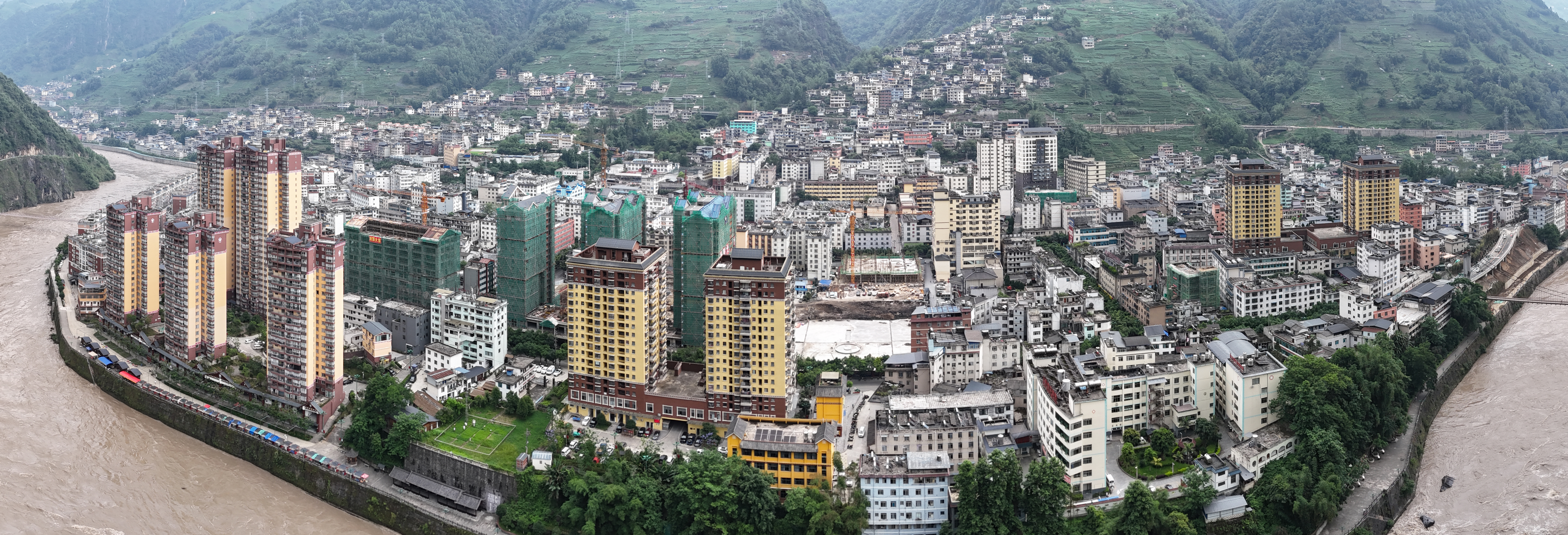
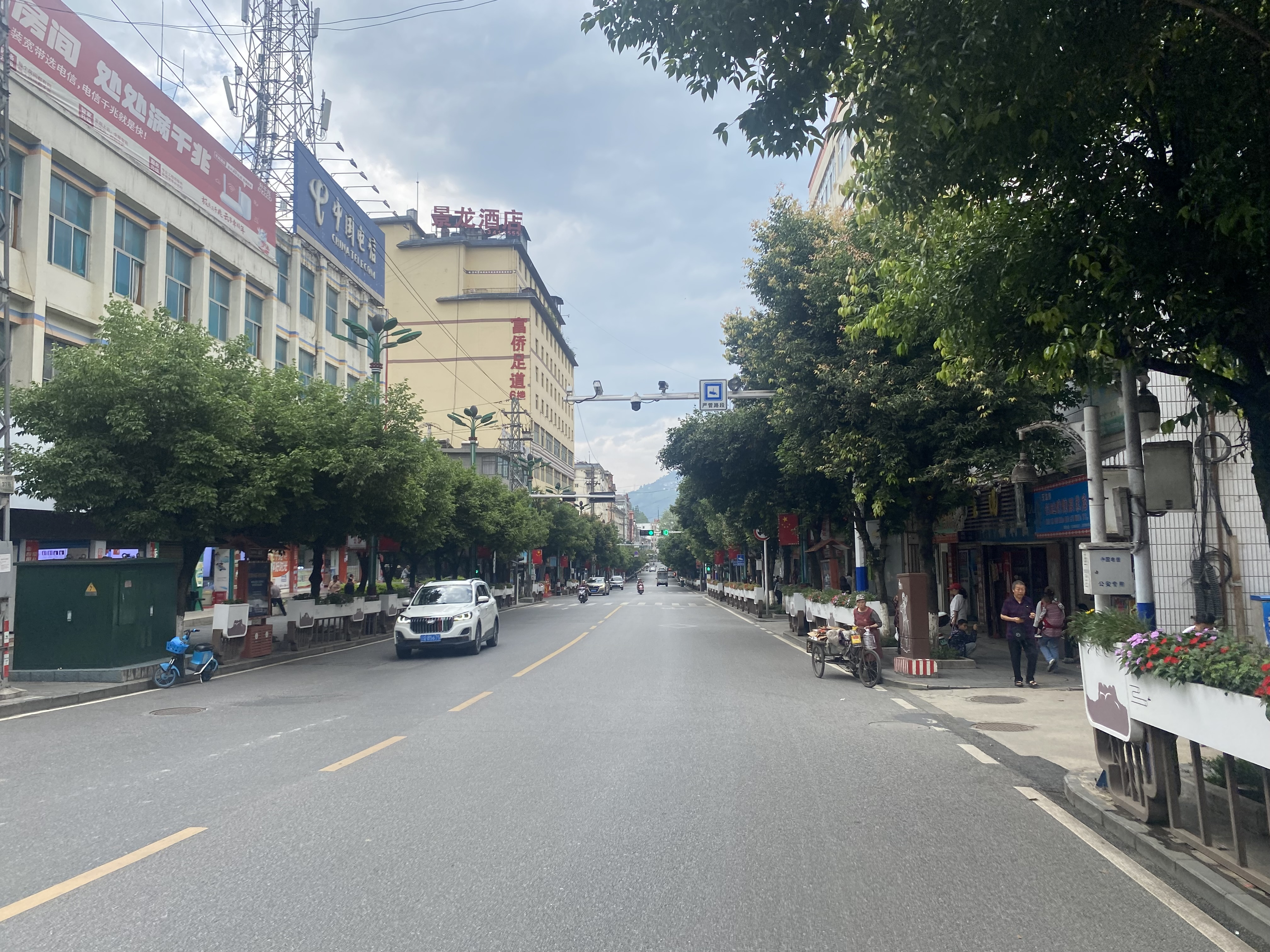
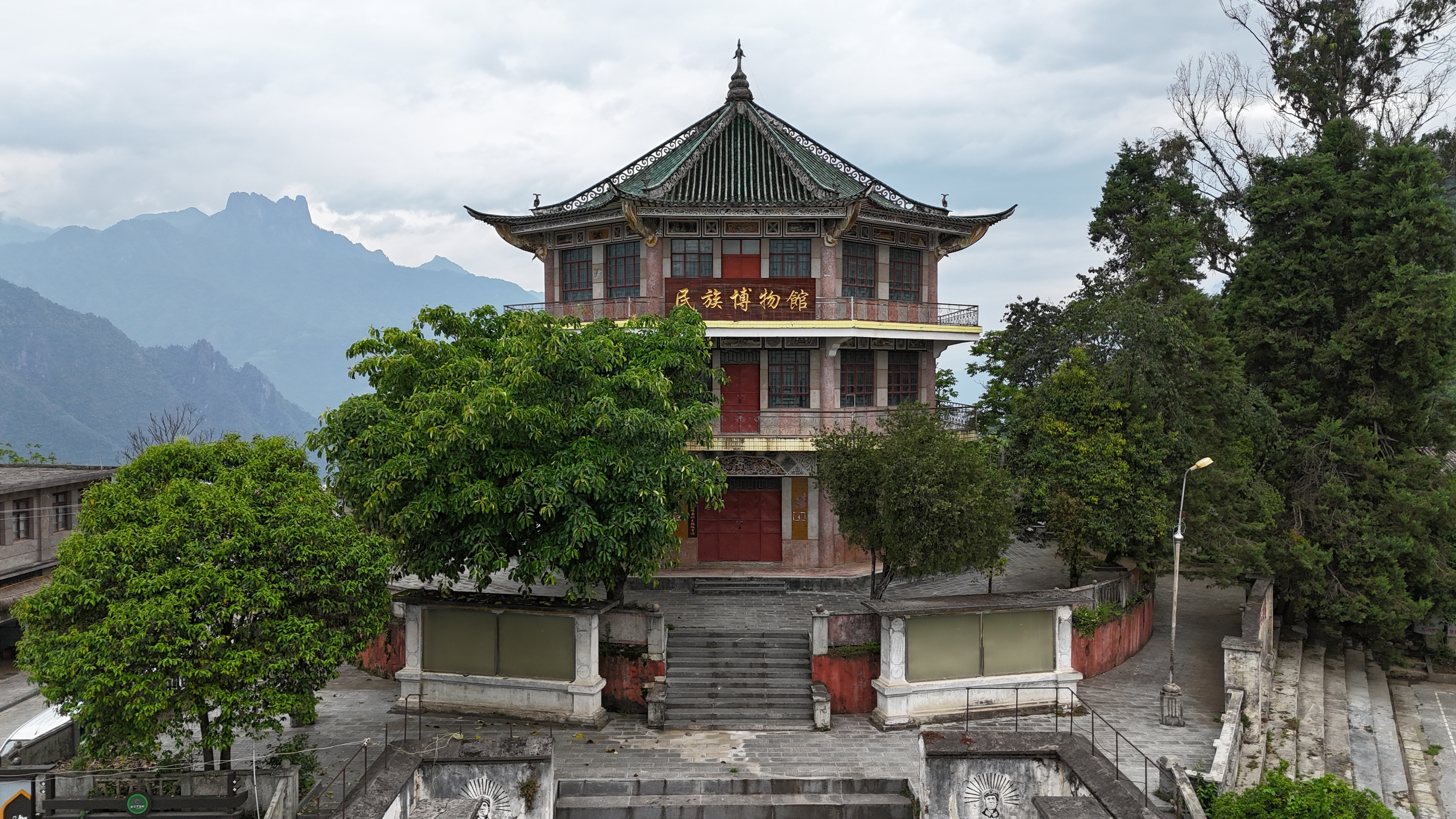
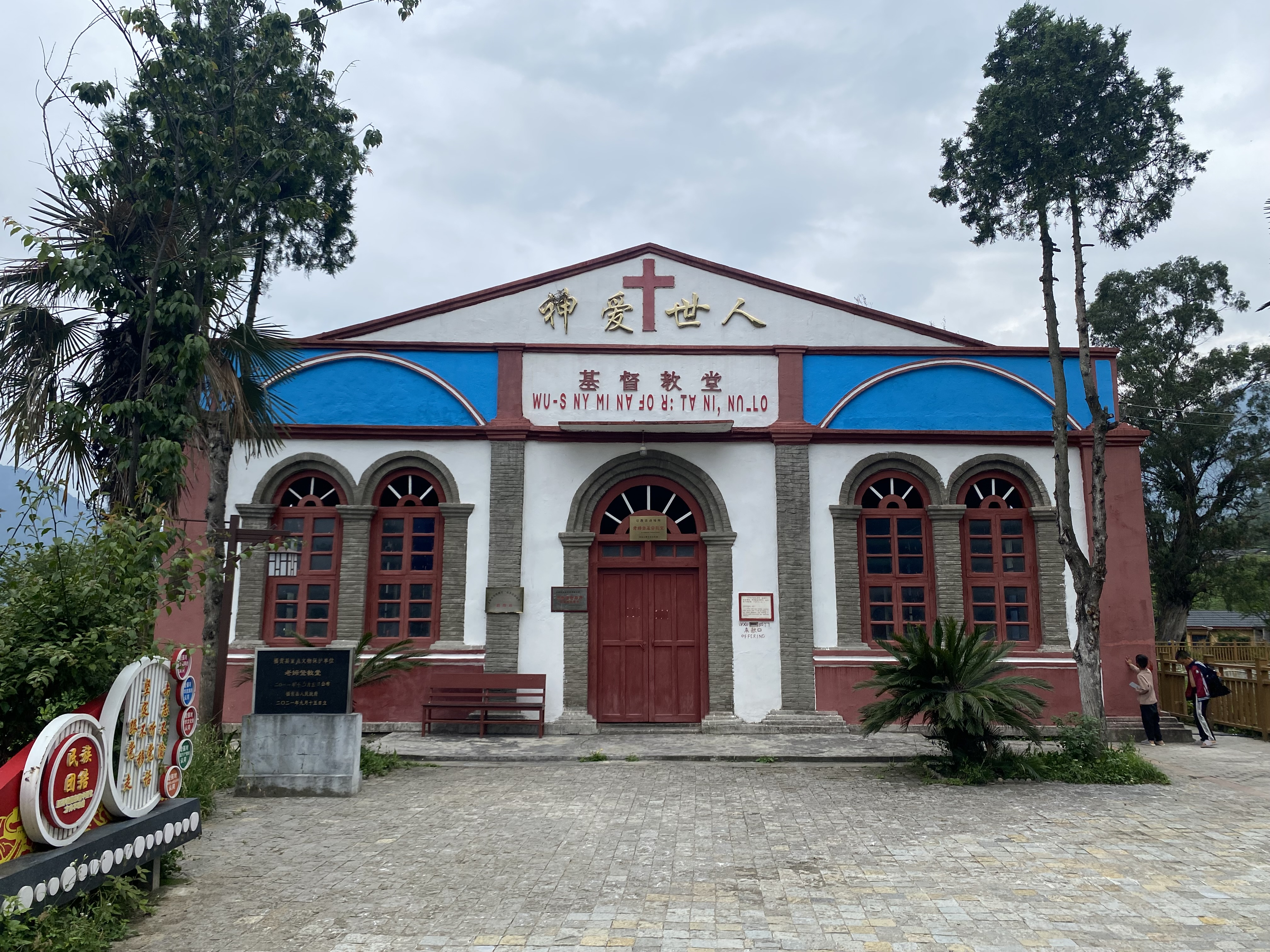
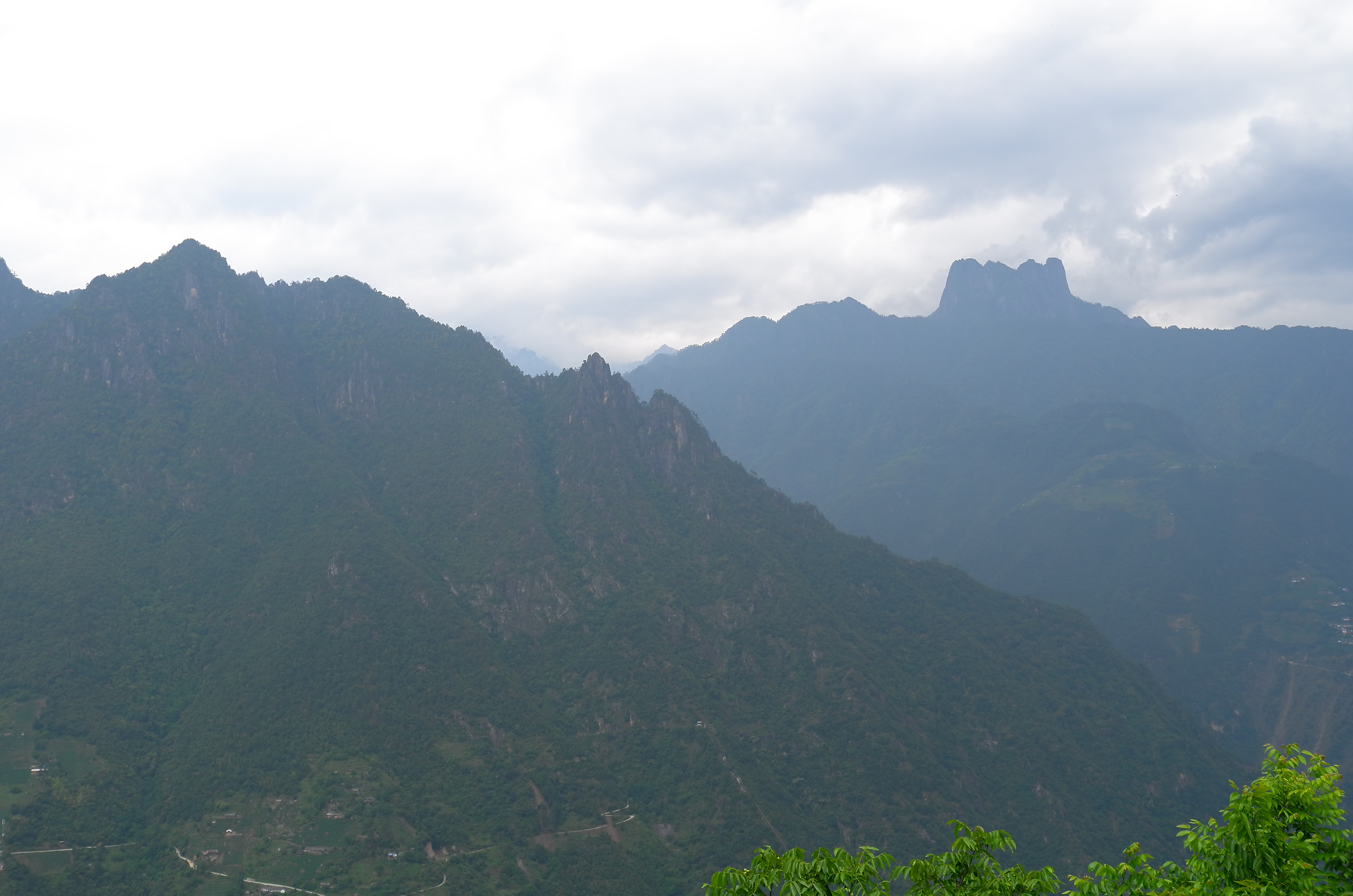
- Cityscape of county town Shangpa Street Octagonal Pavilion of Zhiziluo Laomudeng Church The Crown Peak in Gaoligong Mountains

- Location of Fugong County (red) and Nujiang Prefecture (pink) within Yunnan province

- Location of the seat in Yunnan
- Coordinates: 26°54′07″N 98°52′08″E
- Country: China
- Province: Yunnan
- Autonomous prefecture: Nujiang
- County seat: Shangpa

Area
  - Total: 2,804 km^{2} (1,083 sq mi)

Population (2020 census)
  - Total: 114,372
  - Density: 40.79/km^{2} (105.6/sq mi)
- Postal code: 673400
- Area code: 0886
- Website: www.fugong.gov.cn

Fugong County (simplified Chinese: 福贡县; traditional Chinese: 福貢縣; pinyin: Fúgòng Xiàn, Lisu: ꓩꓴꓽ-ꓗꓳꓹ ꓫꓯꓹ) is a county located in Nujiang Lisu Autonomous Prefecture, in the west of Yunnan province, China, bordering Myanmar's Kachin State to the west. It is known for its high Christian population (70%), thereby being the most Christian county in China.

== Administrative divisions ==
Fugong County has 1 town, 5 townships and 1 ethnic township.

1 town

- Shangpa (上帕镇)

5 townships

- Zilijia (子里甲乡)
- Jiakedi (架科底乡)
- Lumadeng (鹿马登乡)
- Shiyueliang (石月亮乡)
- Maji (马吉乡)

1 ethnic township

- Pihe Nu Ethnic Township (匹河怒族乡)

== Climate ==
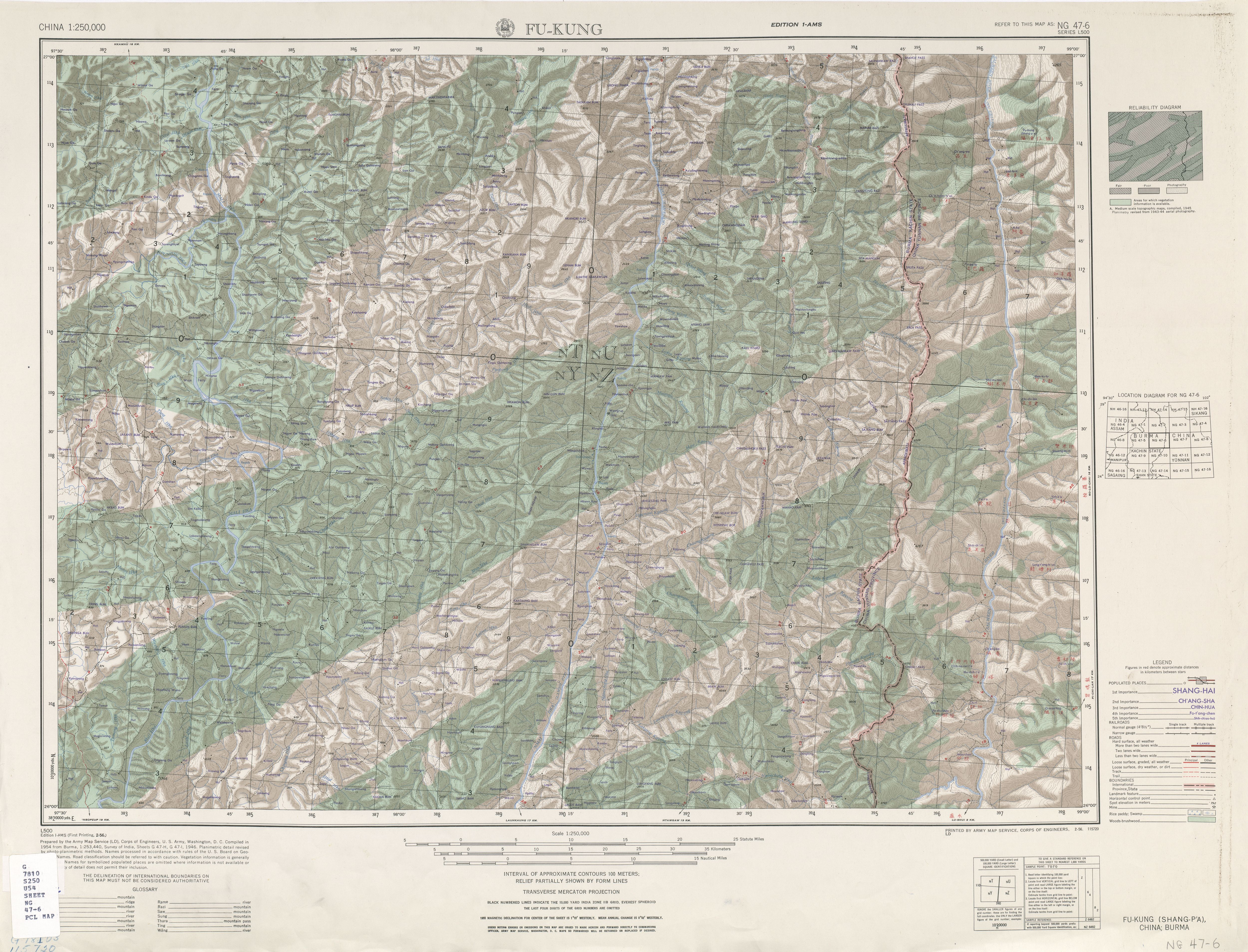
Fugong (labelled as Fu-kung (Shang-p'a) 福貢 (上怕)) (1954)

Climate data for Fugong, elevation 1,190 m (3,900 ft), (1991–2020 normals, extremes 1981–2010)
Month	Jan	Feb	Mar	Apr	May	Jun	Jul	Aug	Sep	Oct	Nov	Dec	Year
Record high °C (°F)	27.2 (81.0)	29.9 (85.8)	34.3 (93.7)	36.0 (96.8)	37.3 (99.1)	37.5 (99.5)	38.3 (100.9)	38.0 (100.4)	37.3 (99.1)	34.5 (94.1)	29.9 (85.8)	25.8 (78.4)	38.3 (100.9)
Mean daily maximum °C (°F)	19.0 (66.2)	20.2 (68.4)	21.0 (69.8)	23.2 (73.8)	26.2 (79.2)	28.9 (84.0)	29.4 (84.9)	30.1 (86.2)	28.6 (83.5)	25.6 (78.1)	22.6 (72.7)	20.2 (68.4)	24.6 (76.3)
Daily mean °C (°F)	9.9 (49.8)	12.0 (53.6)	13.9 (57.0)	16.6 (61.9)	19.8 (67.6)	22.8 (73.0)	23.4 (74.1)	23.5 (74.3)	22.1 (71.8)	18.5 (65.3)	13.8 (56.8)	10.2 (50.4)	17.2 (63.0)
Mean daily minimum °C (°F)	4.9 (40.8)	7.3 (45.1)	9.9 (49.8)	12.8 (55.0)	16.0 (60.8)	19.0 (66.2)	19.8 (67.6)	20.0 (68.0)	18.8 (65.8)	14.9 (58.8)	9.4 (48.9)	5.2 (41.4)	13.2 (55.7)
Record low °C (°F)	0.0 (32.0)	1.6 (34.9)	0.0 (32.0)	6.5 (43.7)	10.0 (50.0)	14.4 (57.9)	15.5 (59.9)	15.2 (59.4)	11.5 (52.7)	7.7 (45.9)	3.3 (37.9)	0.3 (32.5)	0.0 (32.0)
Average precipitation mm (inches)	63.4 (2.50)	122.1 (4.81)	215.5 (8.48)	199.1 (7.84)	160.9 (6.33)	106.2 (4.18)	151.1 (5.95)	120.5 (4.74)	100.7 (3.96)	119.0 (4.69)	40.6 (1.60)	18.5 (0.73)	1,417.6 (55.81)
Average precipitation days (≥ 0.1 mm)	8.0	11.7	18.0	20.8	20.0	20.8	23.6	21.8	19.8	14.9	6.7	3.2	189.3
Average snowy days	0.2	0	0.1	0	0	0	0	0	0	0	0	0	0.3
Average relative humidity (%)	73	72	76	79	80	82	83	82	83	82	79	75	79
Mean monthly sunshine hours	145.5	121.0	111.6	102.5	96.5	85.1	85.0	101.4	85.5	116.9	147.2	160.2	1,358.4
Percentage possible sunshine	44	38	30	26	23	21	20	25	23	33	46	49	32
Source: China Meteorological Administration

== See also ==
- Three Parallel Rivers of Yunnan Protected Areas - UNESCO World Heritage Site
