= Gaoligong Mountains =

Mountain range in Asia

Coordinates: 25°05′N 98°42′E

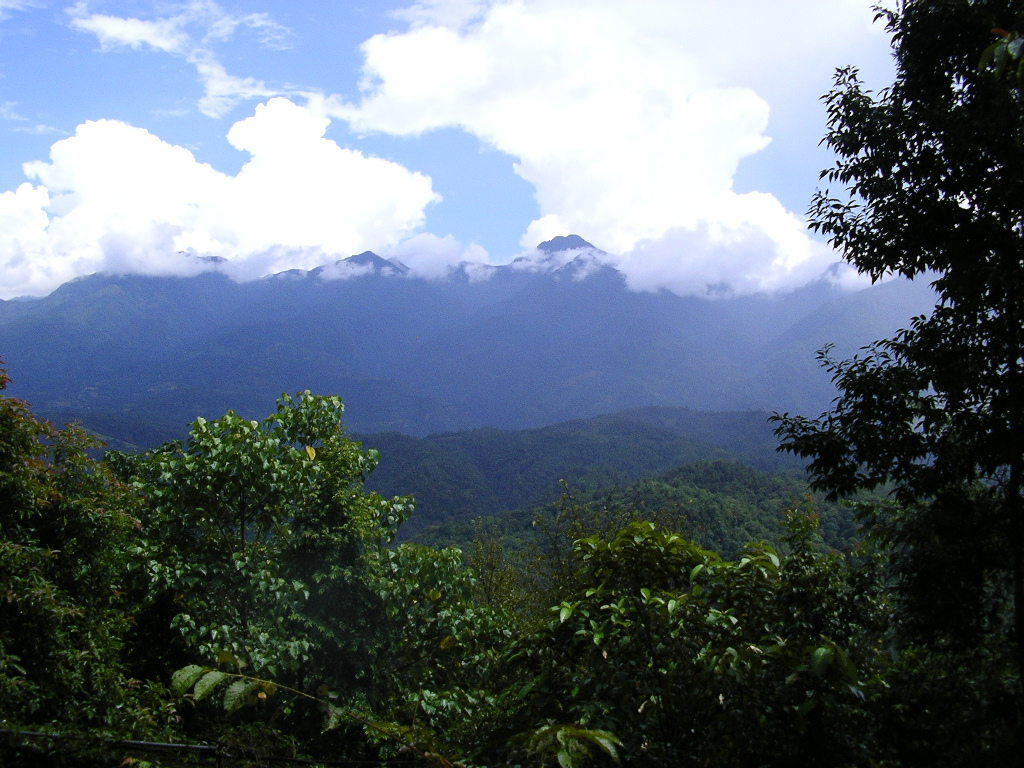
Gaoligong Mountains

The Gaoligong Mountains (Chinese: 高黎贡山; pinyin: Gāolígòng Shān) are a mountainous sub-range of the southern Hengduan Mountain Range, located in the western Yunnan highlands and straddling the border of southwestern China and northern Myanmar (Burma). It is described as a "global biodiversity hotspot" and one of the "biologically richest places on Earth.

== Geography ==
The Gaoligong Mountains are located along the west bank of the Nujiang Valley; from Gongshan county down in to Dehong Prefecture, a distance of approximately 500 kilometres (310 mi). It is the drainage divide between the Nujiang (Salween River) and the Irrawaddy River. The main peak is "Ga her" (嘎普) peak, 5,128 metres (16,824 ft) above sea level. These mountains have an outstanding richness of wildlife.

The mountains have five ecoregions:

- Nujiang Lancang Gorge alpine conifer and mixed forests
- Eastern Himalayan alpine shrub and meadows
- Northern Triangle temperate forests
- Northern Triangle subtropical forests
- Northern Indochina subtropical forests

== Gaoligong Mountain National Nature Reserve ==
The Gaoligong Mountain National Nature Reserve is composed of three distinct areas.

One part is found in the south-central part of the mountain range and covers an area of 120,000 hectares (300,000 acres). Around 9 kilometres (5.6 mi) wide, and reaches over approximately 135 kilometres (84 mi) from north to south — across parts of Lushui County, Baoshan City Prefecture and Tengchong County.

Another large part of the reserve is the Dulongjian area, west of Gongshan, and home to the Derung people.

The highest peak within the reserve is Wona at 3,916 metres (12,848 ft) high.

=== Conservation history ===
In 1983, the Gaoligong Mountain National Nature Reserve was established, and in 1992, the World Wildlife Fund, designated it a level A grade protected area. In 2000, UNESCO accepted it as a Biosphere Reserve member.

The reserve is part of the Three Parallel Rivers of Yunnan Protected Areas, established in 2003, and as such a UNESCO World Heritage Site.

== See also ==
- Gaoligongshania megalothyrsa
- Gaoligongia
- Gaoligongshan National Nature Reserve
- Gaoligong pika
- Gaoligong forest hedgehog
- List of UNESCO Biosphere Reserves in China
