= Gongshan Derung and Nu Autonomous County =

Gongshan County 贡山县 · ꓗꓳꓹ-ꓢ ꓫꓯꓹ · Koksang
- Autonomous county
- 贡山独龙族怒族自治县 ꓗꓳꓹ-ꓢ ꓔꓴꓽ-ꓡꓳꓽ ꓫꓵꓽ ꓠꓳꓸ ꓫꓵꓽ ꓚꓲꓸ ꓛꓬꓽ ꓗꓪꓼ ꓫꓵꓽ ꓫꓯꓹ; Gongshan Derung and Nu Autonomous County
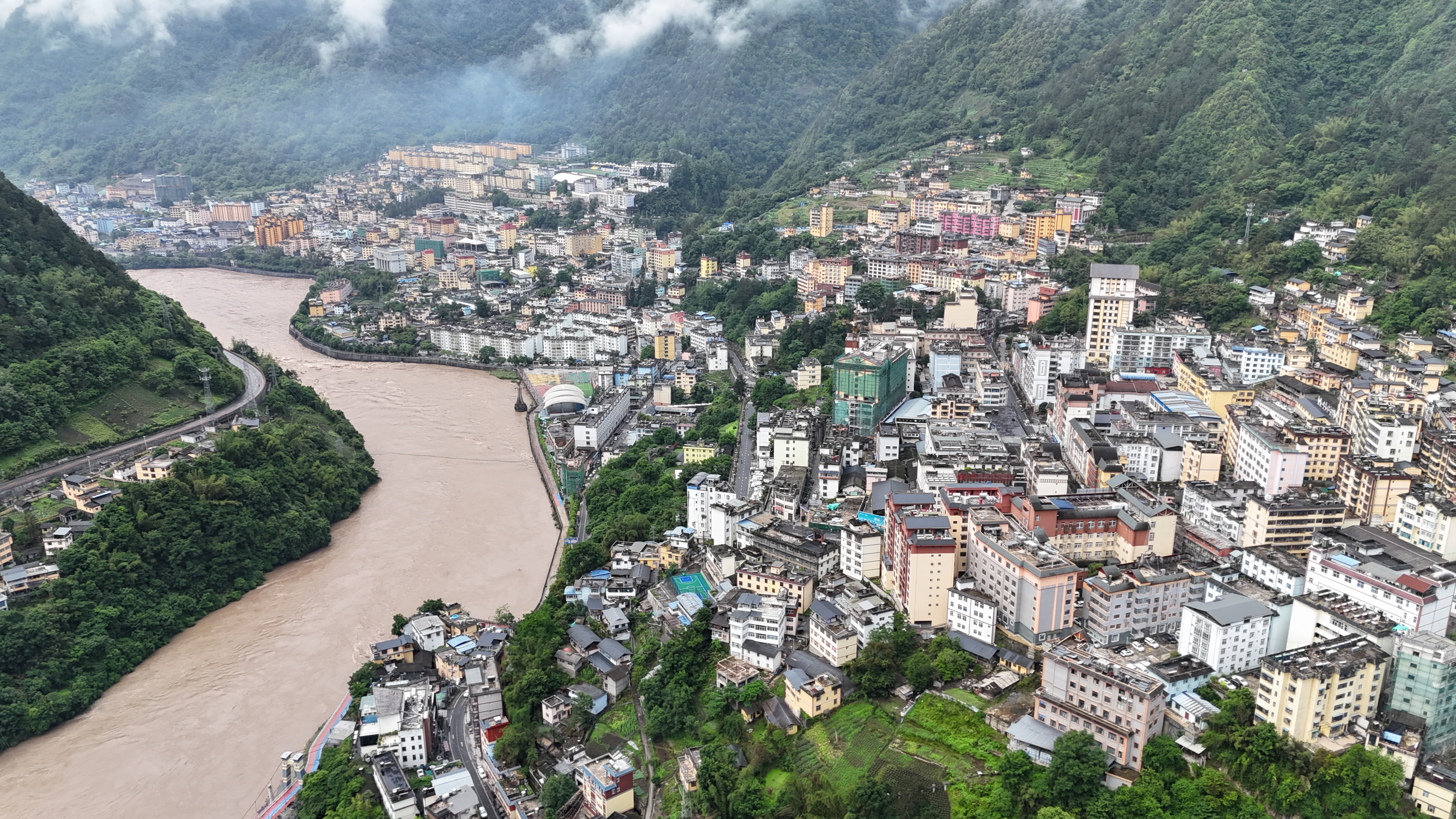
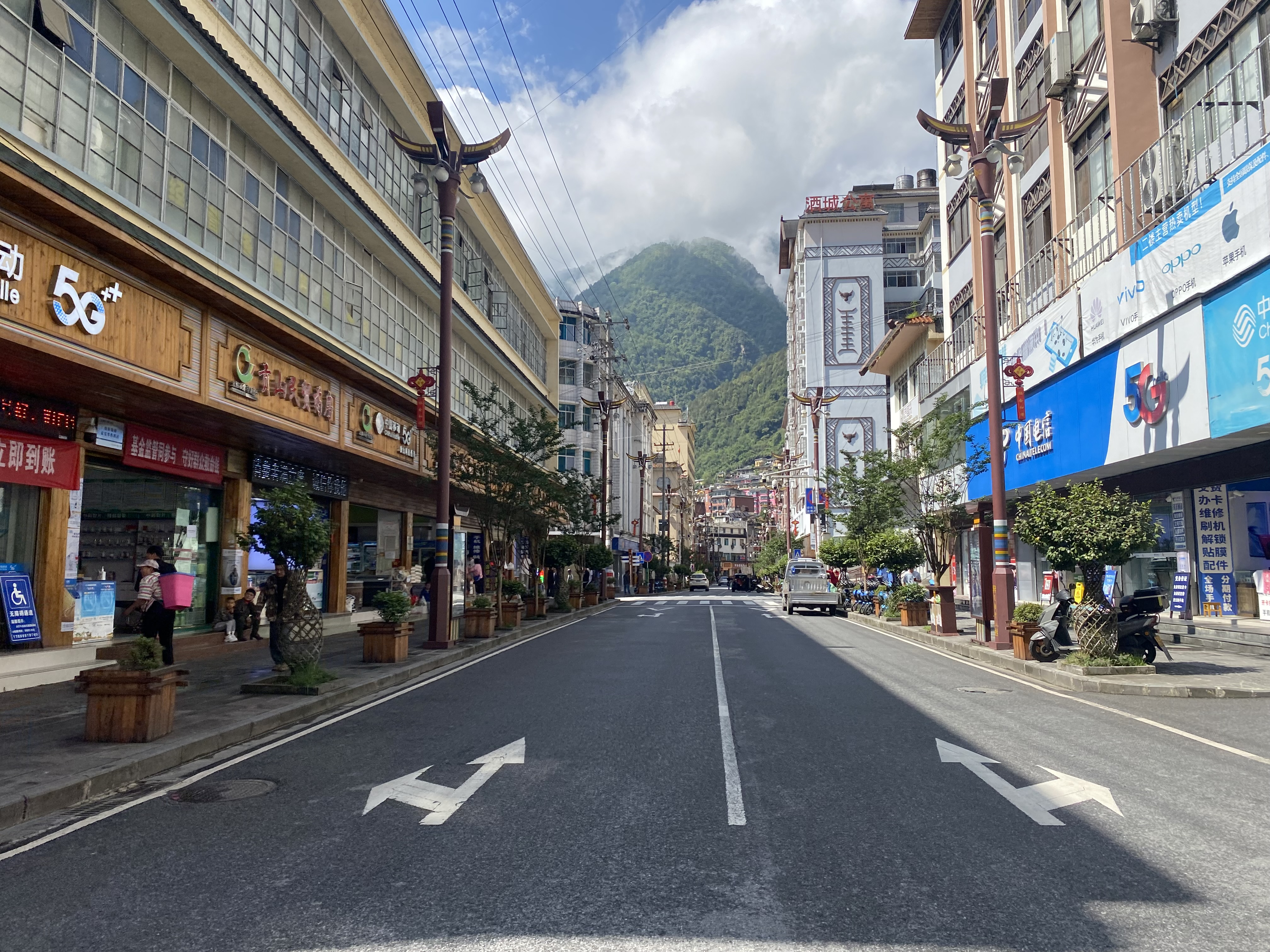
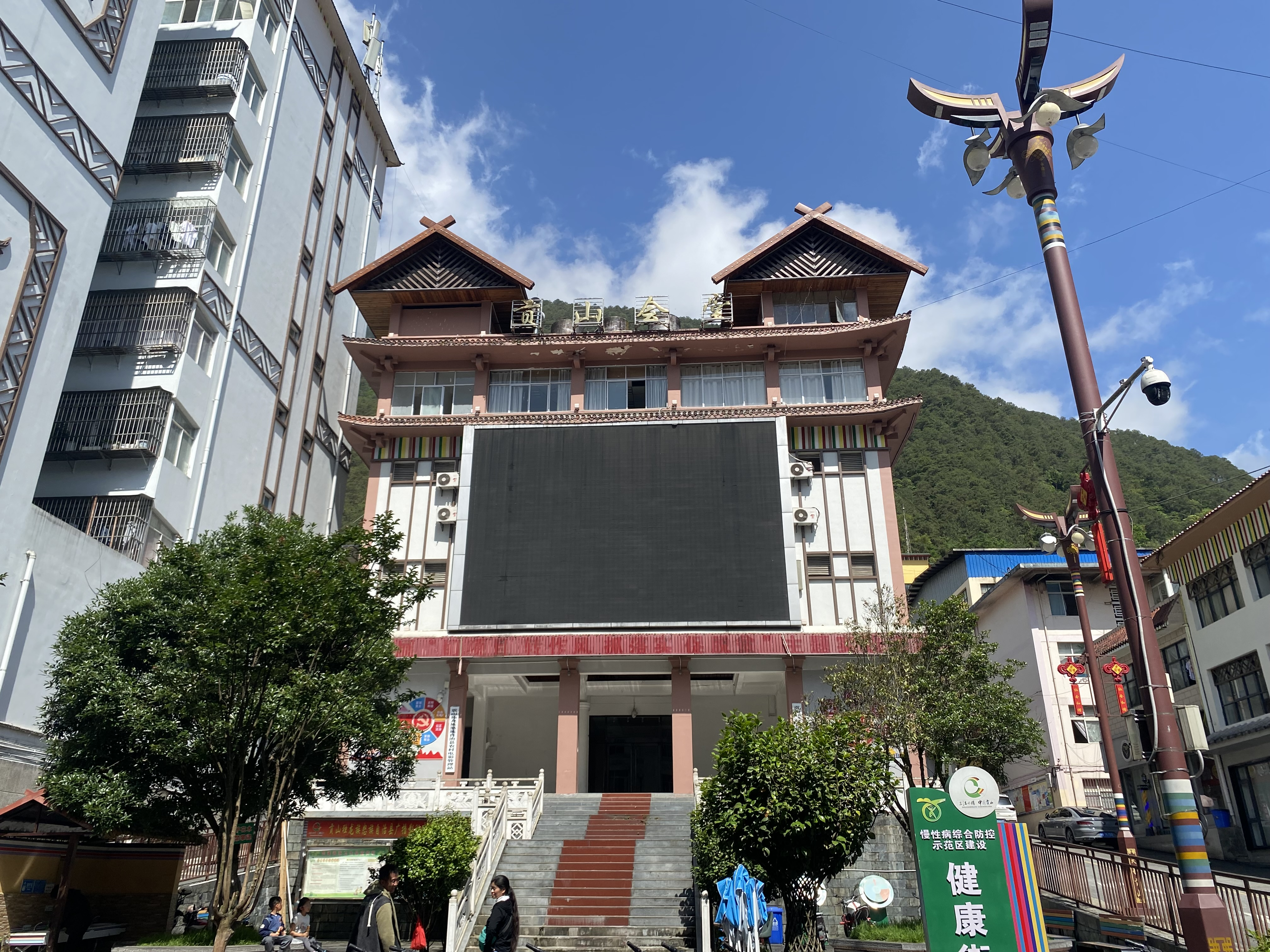
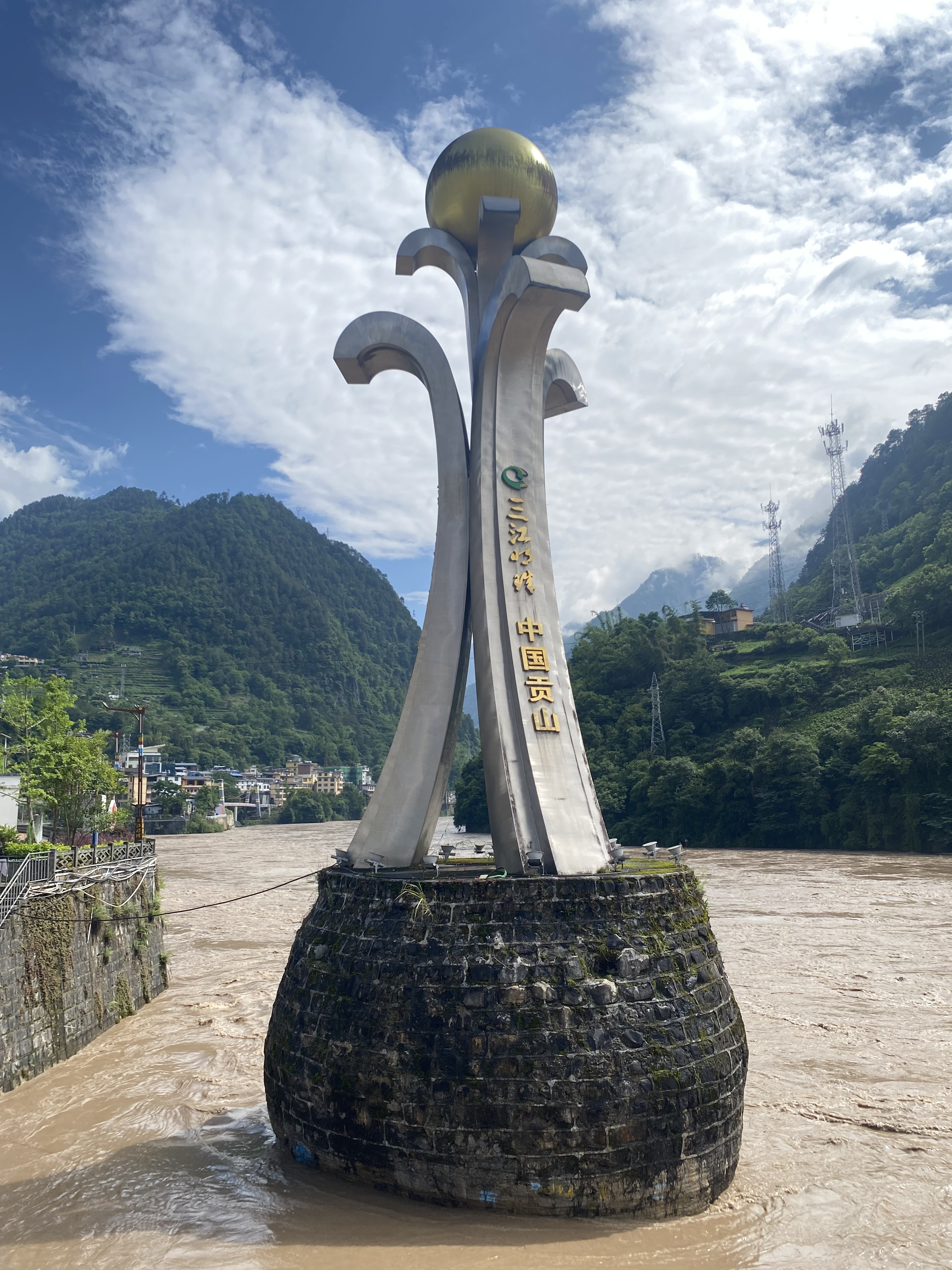
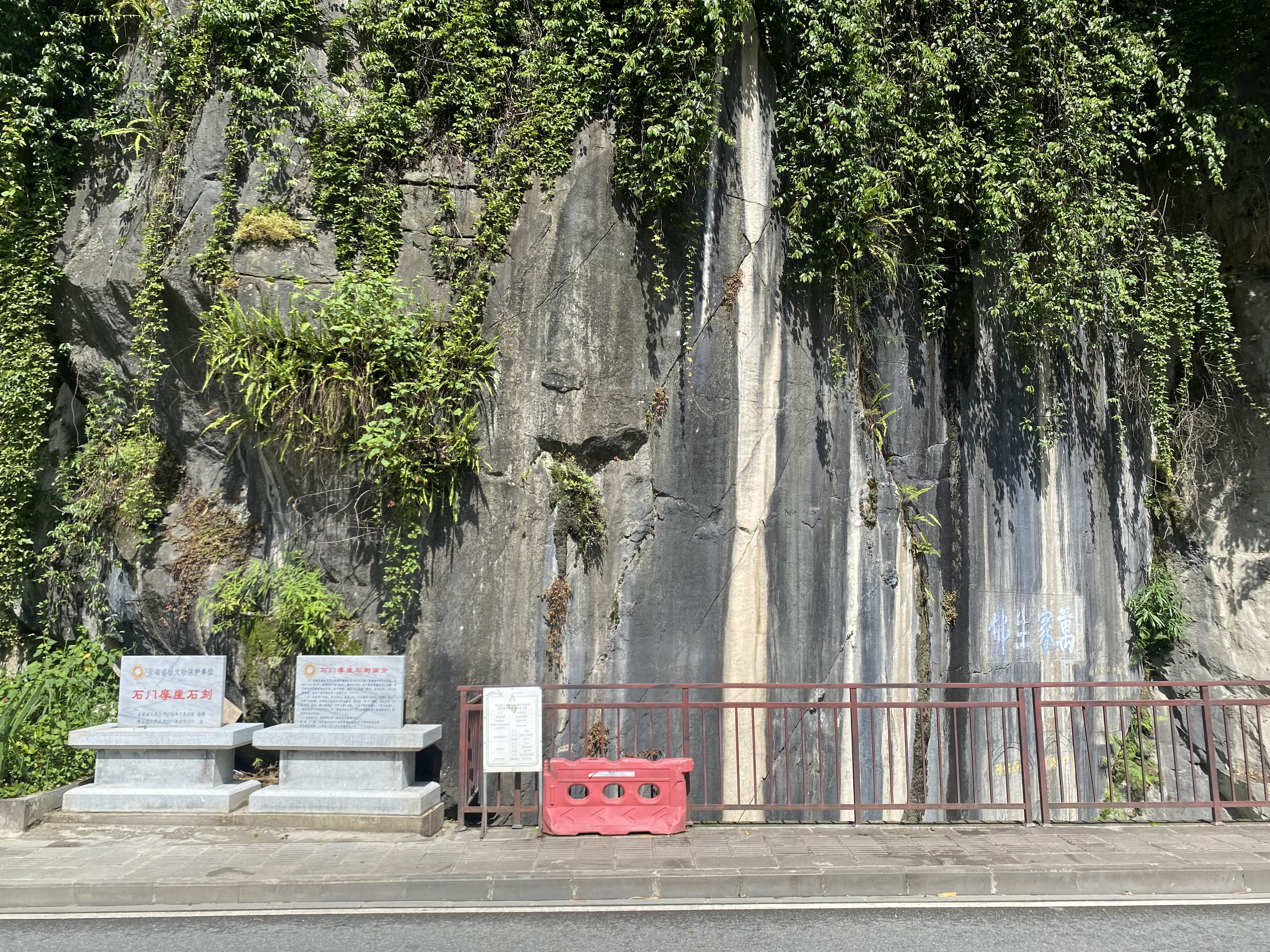
- Cityscape of county town Cikai North Road Gongshan Conference Center Landmark sculpture Shimen Cliff Inscriptions

- Location of Gongshan County (red) and Nujiang Prefecture (pink) within Yunnan province of China

- Location of the seat in Yunnan
- Coordinates: 27.741°N 98.666°E
- Country: China
- Province: Yunnan
- Autonomous prefecture: Nujiang
- County seat: Cikai

Area
  - Total: 4,506 km^{2} (1,740 sq mi)

Population (2020 census)
  - Total: 38,471
  - Density: 8.538/km^{2} (22.11/sq mi)
- Time zone: UTC+8 (CST)
- Postal code: 673500
- Area code: 0886
- Website: gs.nujiang.gov.cn

Gongshan Derung and Nu Autonomous County (simplified Chinese: 贡山独龙族怒族自治县; traditional Chinese: 貢山獨龍族怒族自治縣; pinyin: Gòngshān Dúlóngzú Nùzú Zìzhìxiàn; Lisu: ꓗꓳꓹ-ꓢ ꓔꓴꓽ-ꓡꓳꓽ ꓫꓵꓽ ꓠꓳꓸ ꓫꓵꓽ ꓚꓲꓸ ꓛꓬꓽ ꓗꓪꓼ ꓫꓵꓽ ꓫꓯꓹ; Derung: Koksang, the name has nothing to do with the Derung language for Gaoligong Mountains) is an autonomous county located in Nujiang Lisu Autonomous Prefecture, in the northwest of Yunnan province, China. It has an area of 4,506 km^{2} (1,740 sq mi) and a population of about 37,894 according to the 2010 Census. The county government is stationed in Cikai Town (Derung: Svkeun)

The Nu people in Gongshan (Vnung'long) belongs to the Anu branch (Vnung) and use the Anu language (Nujiang dialect of the Derung language).

== Etymology ==
The county is named after the Gaoligong Mountains (Chinese: 高黎贡山; pinyin: Gāolígòng Shān), which run through the county. The country is known historically as Chamutong or Tramutang.

== Administrative divisions ==
The county is divided into two towns and three townships.

Township-level divisions of Gongshan County
| English name | Chinese | Type | Area (km^{2}) | Population (2010) | Postal Code |
|---|---|---|---|---|---|
| Cikai | 茨开镇 | Town | 779 | 14,478 | 673500 |
| Bingzhongluo | 丙中洛镇 | Town | 823 | 6,465 | 673502 |
| Pengdang Township | 捧当乡 | Township | 488 | 6,085 | 673500 |
| Puladi Township | 普拉底乡 | Township | 422 | 6,627 | 673501 |
| Dulongjiang Township | 独龙江乡 | Township | 1,994 | 4,239 | 673503 |

== History ==
The People's Liberation Army took the county on August 25, 1949, and a provisional government was set up on March 11, 1950. On April 8, the Gongshan County People's Government was established. In October 1956, Gongshan County was changed to Gongshan Derung and Nu Autonomous County.

== Geography ==
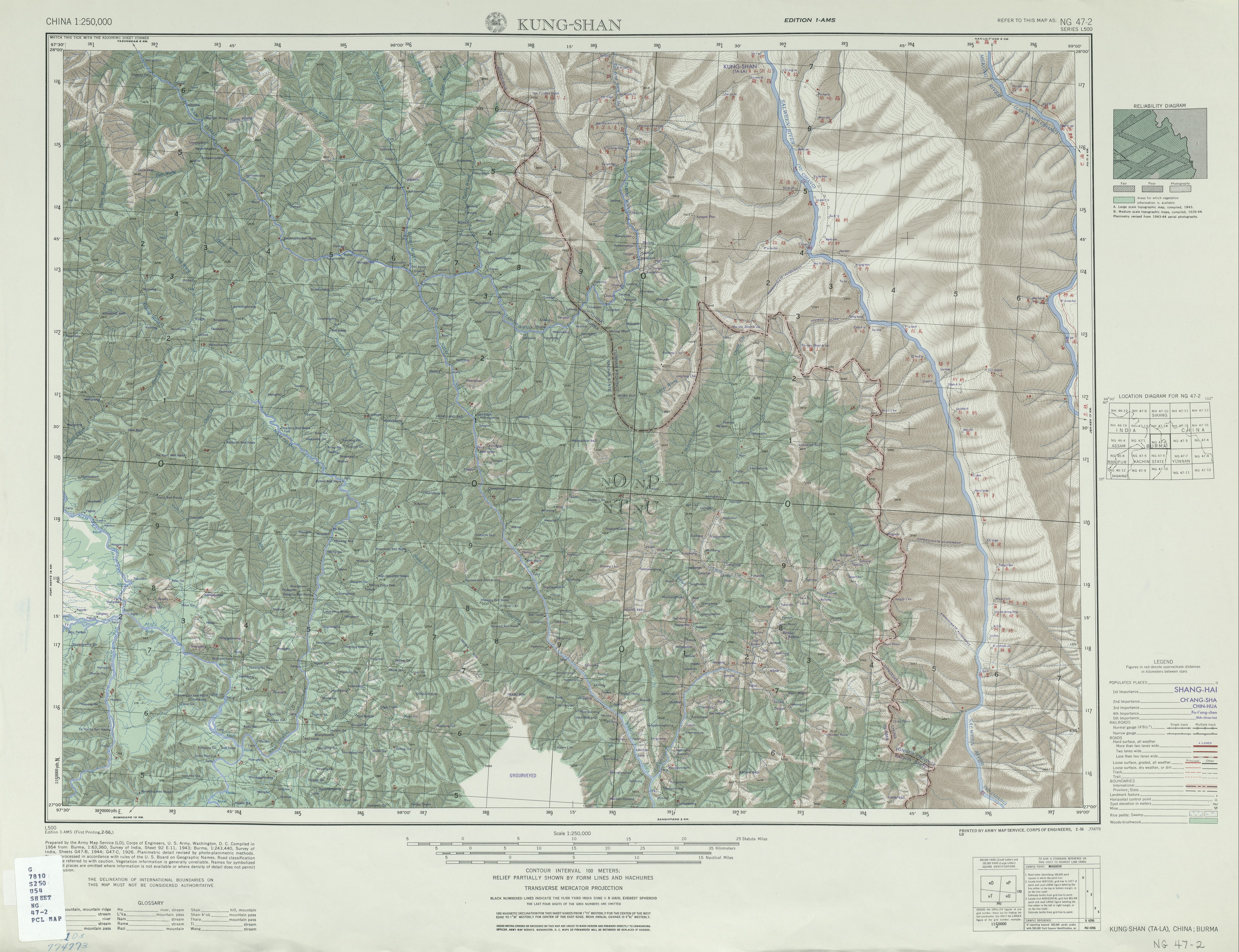
Gongshan (labelled as KUNG-SHAN (TA-LA) 貢山 (打拉)) (1954)

Gongshan occupies the northmost part of Nujiang Lisu Autonomous Prefecture, and has a latitude with a range of 27°29’ to 28°23’N, and a longitude with a range of 98°08’ to 98°56’E. The county covers an area of 4,506 km^{2} (1,740 sq mi), and borders Zayü County in the Tibet Autonomous Region to the north, and Kachin State of Myanmar to the west. it also borders Deqin County and Weixi County to the east and Fugong County to the south. The county's boundary with Burma is 172.008 kilometers in length, and the county's boundary with Tibet is 135 kilometers.

It is located in the Hengduan Mountains, and with the Salween and N'Mai rivers running through the county. The N'Mai River is known for its green appearance. In the spring, flowers blossom in the fields and gardens of Bingzhongluo.

The county's three major mountain ranges are the Biluo Snow Mountains (Chinese: 碧罗雪山), the Gaoligong Mountains, and the Dandanglika Mountains.

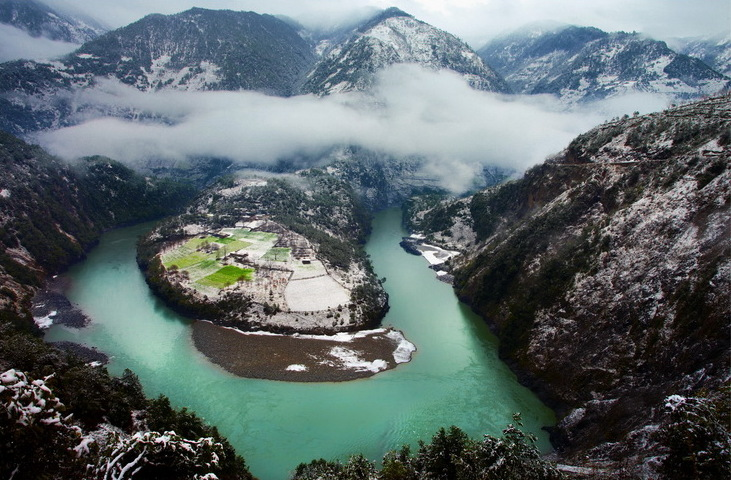
The Salween River flowing through Gongshan

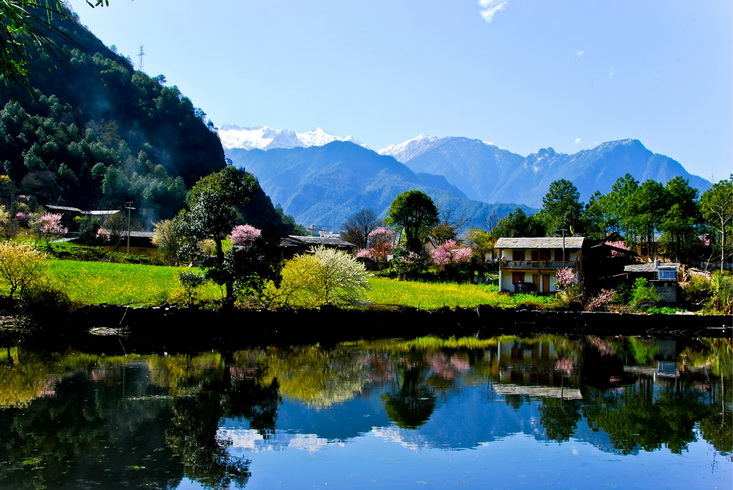
Ridang, Gongshan

=== Climate ===
Climate data for Gongshan, elevation 1,583 m (5,194 ft), (1991–2020 normals, extremes 1981–present)
| Month | Jan | Feb | Mar | Apr | May | Jun | Jul | Aug | Sep | Oct | Nov | Dec | Year |
|---|---|---|---|---|---|---|---|---|---|---|---|---|---|
| Record high °C (°F) | 23.0 (73.4) | 25.7 (78.3) | 30.4 (86.7) | 31.9 (89.4) | 33.9 (93.0) | 35.5 (95.9) | 34.1 (93.4) | 35.0 (95.0) | 35.2 (95.4) | 30.8 (87.4) | 25.8 (78.4) | 21.6 (70.9) | 35.5 (95.9) |
| Mean daily maximum °C (°F) | 15.3 (59.5) | 16.1 (61.0) | 17.3 (63.1) | 20.4 (68.7) | 24.0 (75.2) | 26.4 (79.5) | 27.1 (80.8) | 27.7 (81.9) | 25.8 (78.4) | 22.9 (73.2) | 19.4 (66.9) | 16.6 (61.9) | 21.6 (70.8) |
| Daily mean °C (°F) | 7.7 (45.9) | 9.3 (48.7) | 11.0 (51.8) | 13.9 (57.0) | 17.6 (63.7) | 20.7 (69.3) | 21.5 (70.7) | 21.5 (70.7) | 19.9 (67.8) | 16.0 (60.8) | 11.4 (52.5) | 8.2 (46.8) | 14.9 (58.8) |
| Mean daily minimum °C (°F) | 2.6 (36.7) | 4.8 (40.6) | 7.0 (44.6) | 10.1 (50.2) | 13.7 (56.7) | 17.5 (63.5) | 18.5 (65.3) | 18.3 (64.9) | 16.9 (62.4) | 12.2 (54.0) | 6.6 (43.9) | 2.7 (36.9) | 10.9 (51.6) |
| Record low °C (°F) | −2.2 (28.0) | −1.0 (30.2) | −0.2 (31.6) | 0.4 (32.7) | 7.6 (45.7) | 11.5 (52.7) | 13.4 (56.1) | 13.6 (56.5) | 9.3 (48.7) | 4.5 (40.1) | 0.9 (33.6) | −2.2 (28.0) | −2.2 (28.0) |
| Average precipitation mm (inches) | 73.7 (2.90) | 118.7 (4.67) | 226.6 (8.92) | 194.4 (7.65) | 178.3 (7.02) | 193.0 (7.60) | 206.3 (8.12) | 169.2 (6.66) | 152.0 (5.98) | 126.0 (4.96) | 41.1 (1.62) | 20.0 (0.79) | 1,699.3 (66.89) |
| Average precipitation days (≥ 0.1 mm) | 9.3 | 13.7 | 20.4 | 21.9 | 21.9 | 24.9 | 26.2 | 24.4 | 22.6 | 15.7 | 7.8 | 4.2 | 213 |
| Average snowy days | 1.0 | 0.9 | 0.7 | 0.1 | 0 | 0 | 0 | 0 | 0 | 0 | 0.1 | 0.1 | 2.9 |
| Average relative humidity (%) | 70 | 74 | 78 | 80 | 80 | 84 | 86 | 85 | 86 | 83 | 78 | 72 | 80 |
| Mean monthly sunshine hours | 117.0 | 89.2 | 87.5 | 86.6 | 90.9 | 78.4 | 81.5 | 97.0 | 80.3 | 113.0 | 122.4 | 136.6 | 1,180.4 |
| Percentage possible sunshine | 36 | 28 | 23 | 22 | 22 | 19 | 19 | 24 | 22 | 32 | 38 | 42 | 27 |
Source: China Meteorological Administration

== Demographics ==
The county's population as of the 2010 Chinese Census was 37,894, up from the 34,746 recorded in the 2000 Chinese Census, and the 33,000 people estimated to be living in the county as of 1996.

As of 2003, 34,622 people were living in the county, of which, 83.8% lived in rural areas. The ethnic composition of the county in 2003 was 51.7% Lisu, 18.2% Nu, 14.7% Derung, 4.6% Tibetan, 6.3% other officially recognized ethnic groups, and the remaining 4.5% belonging to unrecognized ethnic groups.

== Economy ==
Mineral deposits in the county include lead, tin, zinc, white marble, and mutton fat jade (Chinese: 羊脂玉).

== Culture ==
Gongshan is a notoriously remote place, isolated by its mountains and gorges. National Geographic author Joseph F. Rock came to the area during the 1920s and early 1930s, and wrote about the area in several articles for National Geographic Magazine. He described Gongshan as a virgin land where no white man had ever came before, and as a paradise for explorers, photographers and botanists.

The county's Derung and Nu people host numerous ethnic festivals.

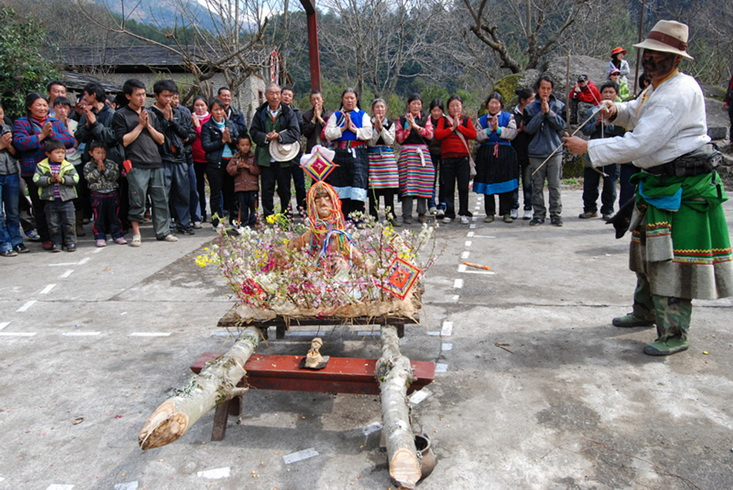
Peach flower festival in Gongshan

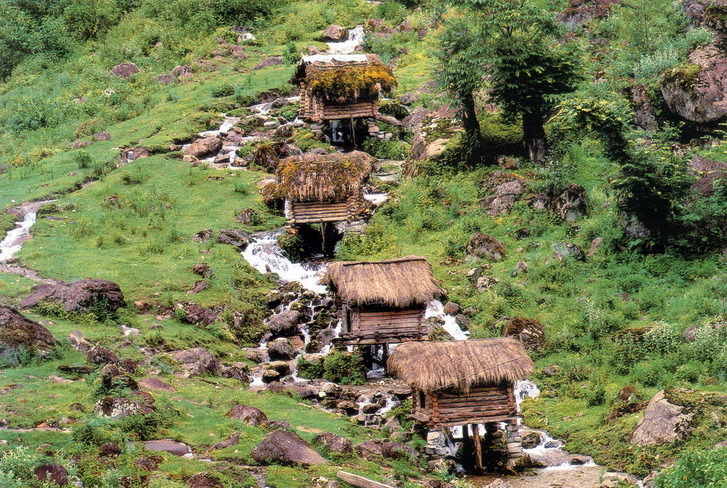
Water mill in Gongshan

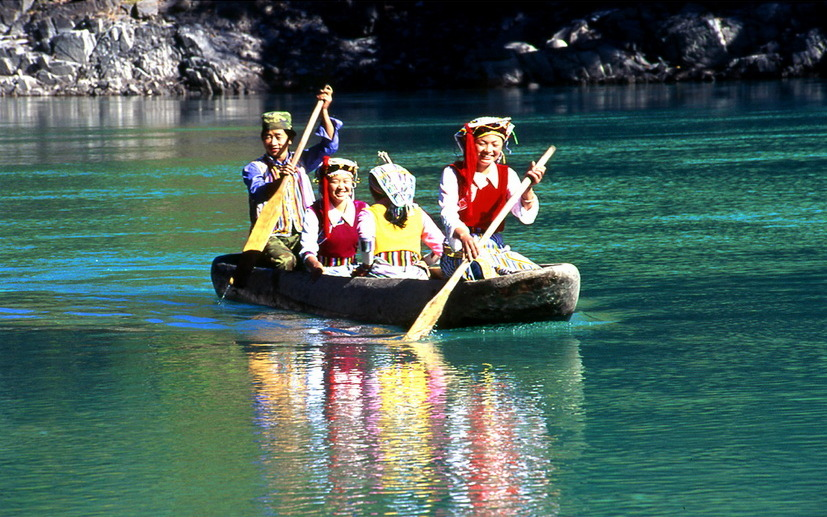
Salween River in Gongshan, Yunnan

=== Piao Niu Wu ===
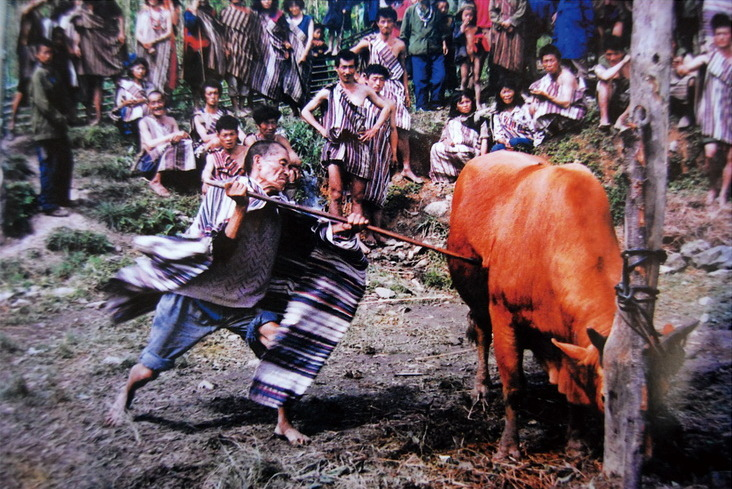
Piao Niu Wu

Piao Niu Wu (Chinese: 剽牛舞, literally "slaughter cattle dance") is a traditional ceremony of the Derung People unique to Gongshan County. Traditionally performed during Derung New Year, the ceremony is prepared by tying a cattle to a sacrificial pole with traditional Derung rope, placing bead ornaments on the cattle, and placing other material sacrifices in front of it. The host of the ceremony then leads a prayer, and another man pierces the cattle's heart with a bamboo spear once the prayer is finished. Before preparing the dead cattle for further use, the ceremony host performs a ritual fortune-telling. This follows with traditional song and dance. In modern times, the festival has become less common, and is typically for entertainment purposes, rather than spiritual ones.

== See also ==
- Three Parallel Rivers of Yunnan Protected Areas – UNESCO World Heritage Site
- Dimaluo – village in Pengdang Township
