= Three Parallel Rivers =

Three Parallel Rivers of Yunnan Protected Areas
UNESCO World Heritage Site
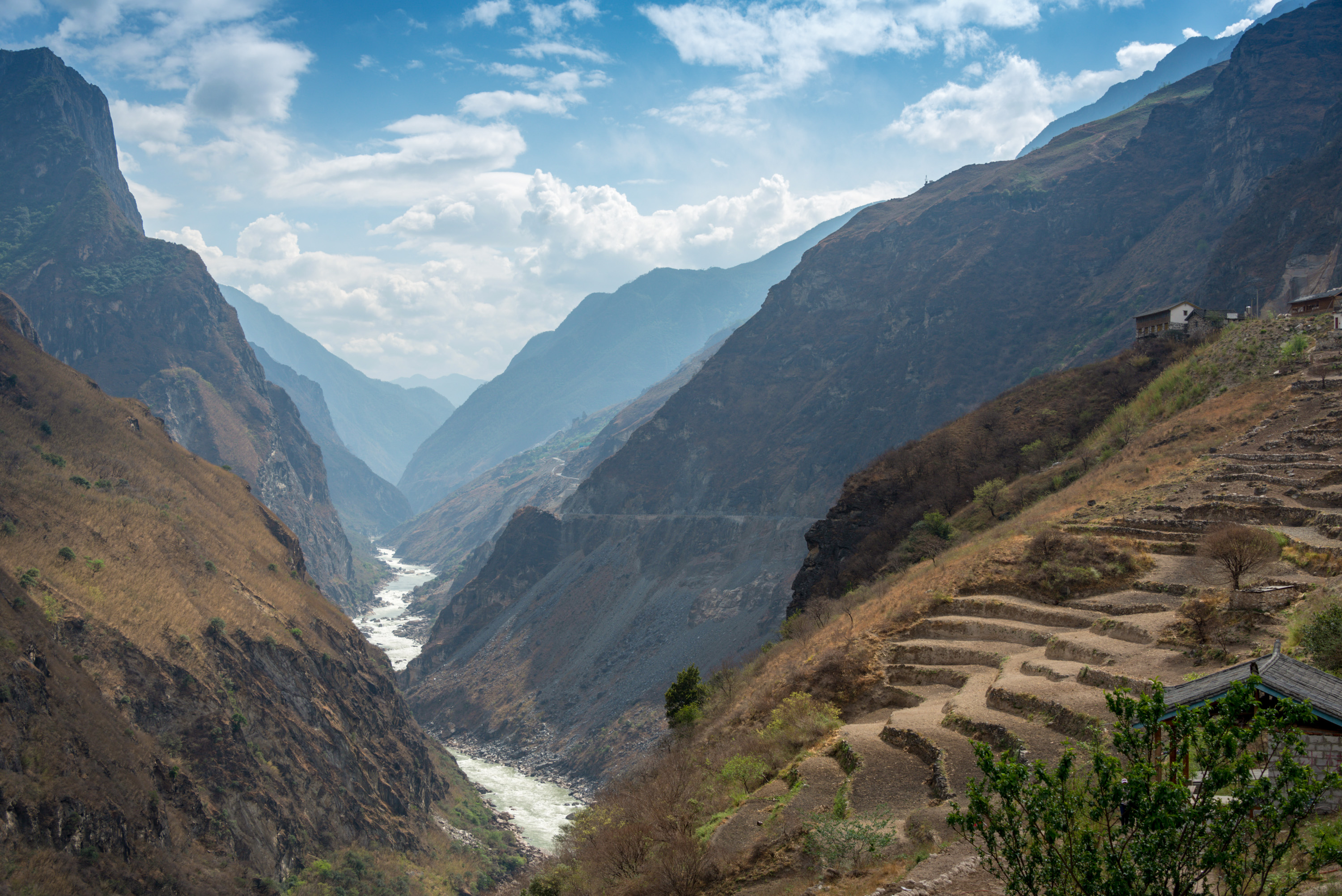
- Jinsha River Gorge in Three Parallel Rivers Preserve

- Location within Yunnan Location within China
- Location: Yunnan, China
- Criteria: Natural: (vii)(viii)(ix)(x)
- Reference: 1083
- Inscription: 2003 (27th Session)
- Extensions: 2010
- Coordinates: 27°44′16″N 98°40′02″E

Three Parallel Rivers
Jinsha River (Yangtze)
Lancang River (Mekong)
Nu River (Salween)

The Three Parallel Rivers of Yunnan Protected Areas (Chinese: 云南三江并流; pinyin: Yúnnán Sānjiāng Bìngliú) is a UNESCO World Heritage Site in Yunnan province, China. It lies within the drainage basins of the upper reaches of the Jinsha (Yangtze), Lancang (Mekong) and Nujiang (Salween) rivers, in the Yunnan section of the Hengduan Mountains.

== Geography ==
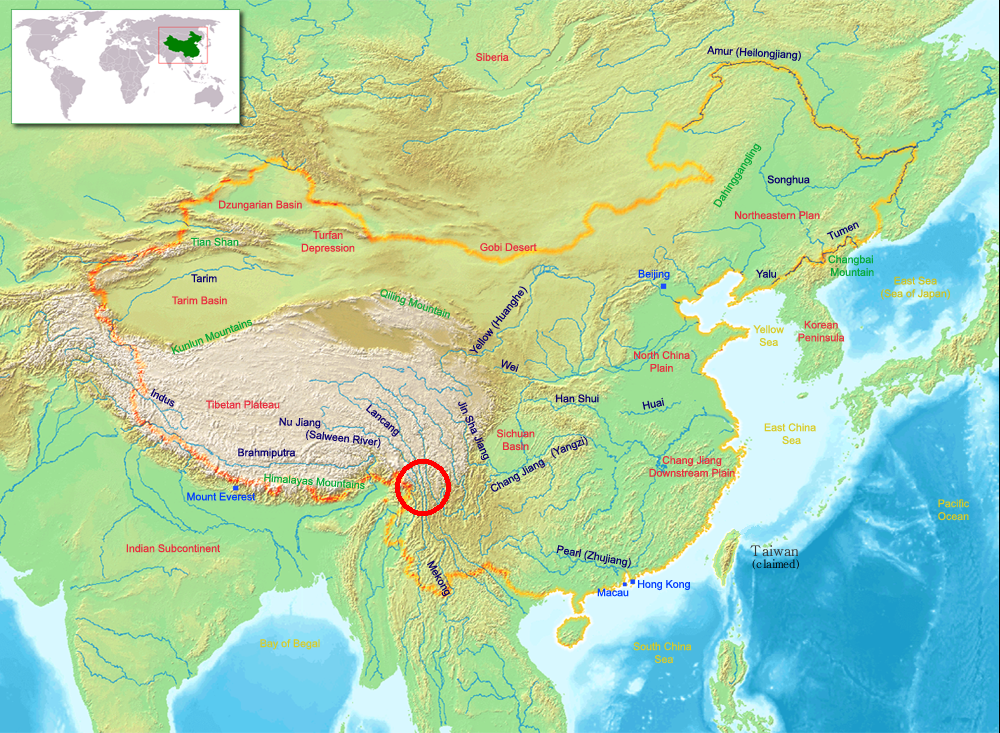
Location of Three Parallel Rivers of Yunnan Protected Areas indicated by a red circle

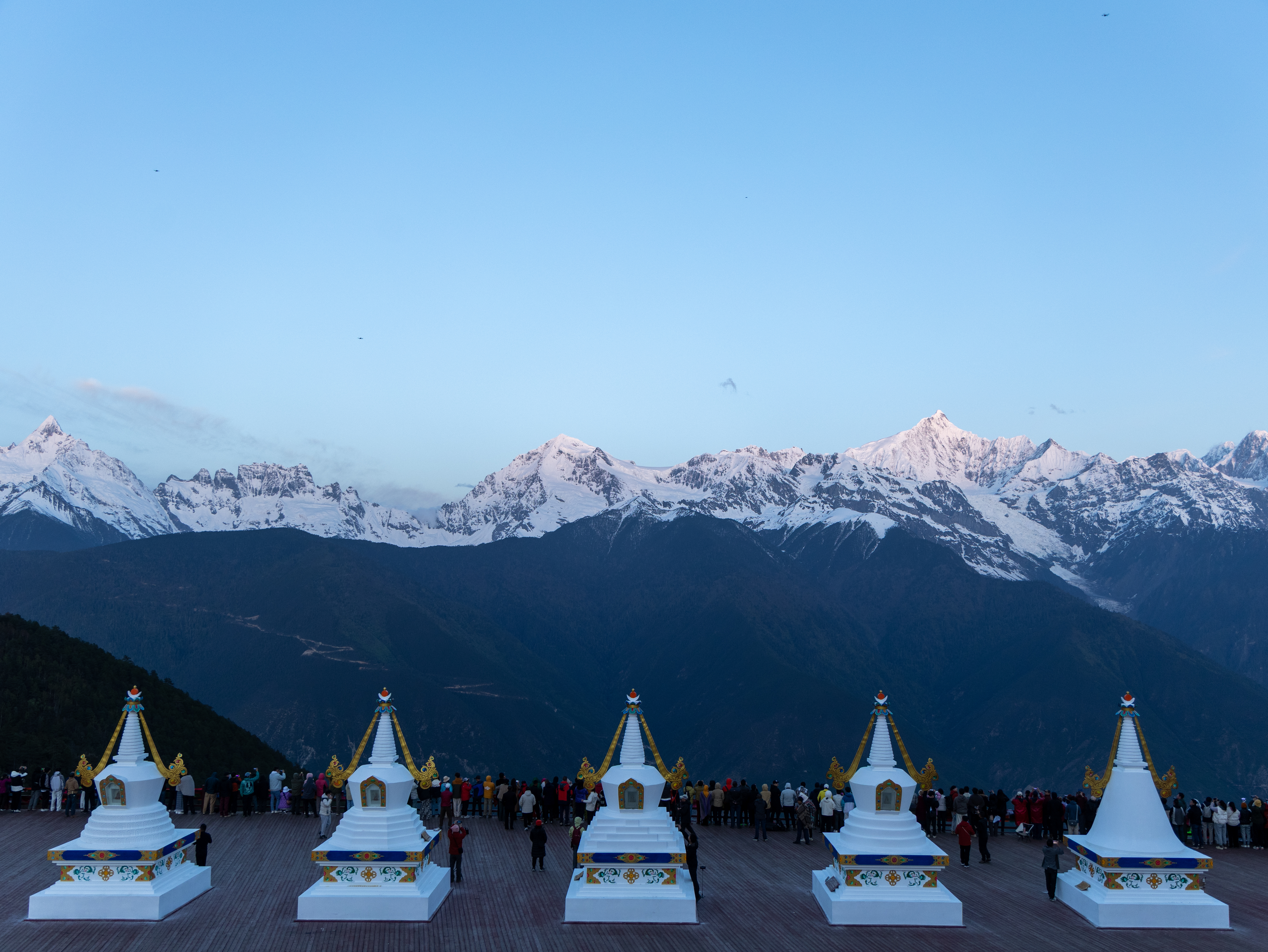
Meili Xue Shan—Meili Snow Mountains, in Yunnan Protected Area

The protected areas extend over 15 core areas, totalling 939,441.4 ha, and buffer areas, totalling 758,977.8 ha across a region of 180 km by 310 km. Here, for a distance of over 300 km, three of Asia's great rivers run roughly parallel to one another though separated by high mountain ranges with peaks over 6,000 meters. After this area of near confluence, the rivers greatly diverge: the Nujiang River becomes Salween and empties out at Moulmein, Burma, into the Indian Ocean; the Lancang becomes the Mekong and empties at south of Ho Chi Minh City, Vietnam into the South China Sea; and the Yangtze flows into the East China Sea at Shanghai. Selected nature reserves and places of scenic beauty in this unique region were collectively awarded World Heritage Site status in 2003 for their very rich biodiversity and outstanding topographical diversity.

Running parallel to these three rivers, slightly to the west, is the river gorge of the N'Mai River, the main tributary to the Irrawaddy River. About 100 kilometers to the west and northwest is the watershed of the Lohit River, a tributary of the Brahmaputra River and the greater Ganges-Brahmaputra system. Thus, in this unique mountainous region, adjacent headwaters feed five of Asia's most significant rivers; from east to west, they are: Yangtze, Mekong, Salween, Irrawaddy, and the Ganges-Brahmaputra. They are all among the top 15 rivers on the continent by volume or length.

According to the UNESCO World Heritage Site description, "an exceptional range of topographical features - from gorges to karst to glaciated peaks -- is associated with the site being at a 'collision point' of tectonic plates". Due to its topography and geographical location, the Three Parallel Rivers region contains many climate types. Average annual precipitation ranges from 4,600 mm in the Dulongjiang area in the west of Gongshan county to 300 mm in the upper valleys of the Yangtze river.

== Culture ==
The Three Parallel Rivers has been acknowledged as a natural World Heritage Site. Demographically, the region contains many of the twenty-five ethnic groups found in Yunnan province (including the Derung, the smallest of all of China's minority groups). Other minorities found in this region include the Tibetan people, the Nu people, the Lisu, the Bai, the Pumi and the Naxi. Many of these minorities still use traditional costumes as their normal daily attire.

In the same region as the Three Parallel Rivers of Yunnan Protected Areas lies the Old Town of Lijiang, which is also a World Heritage Site in its own right.

Three Parallel Rivers

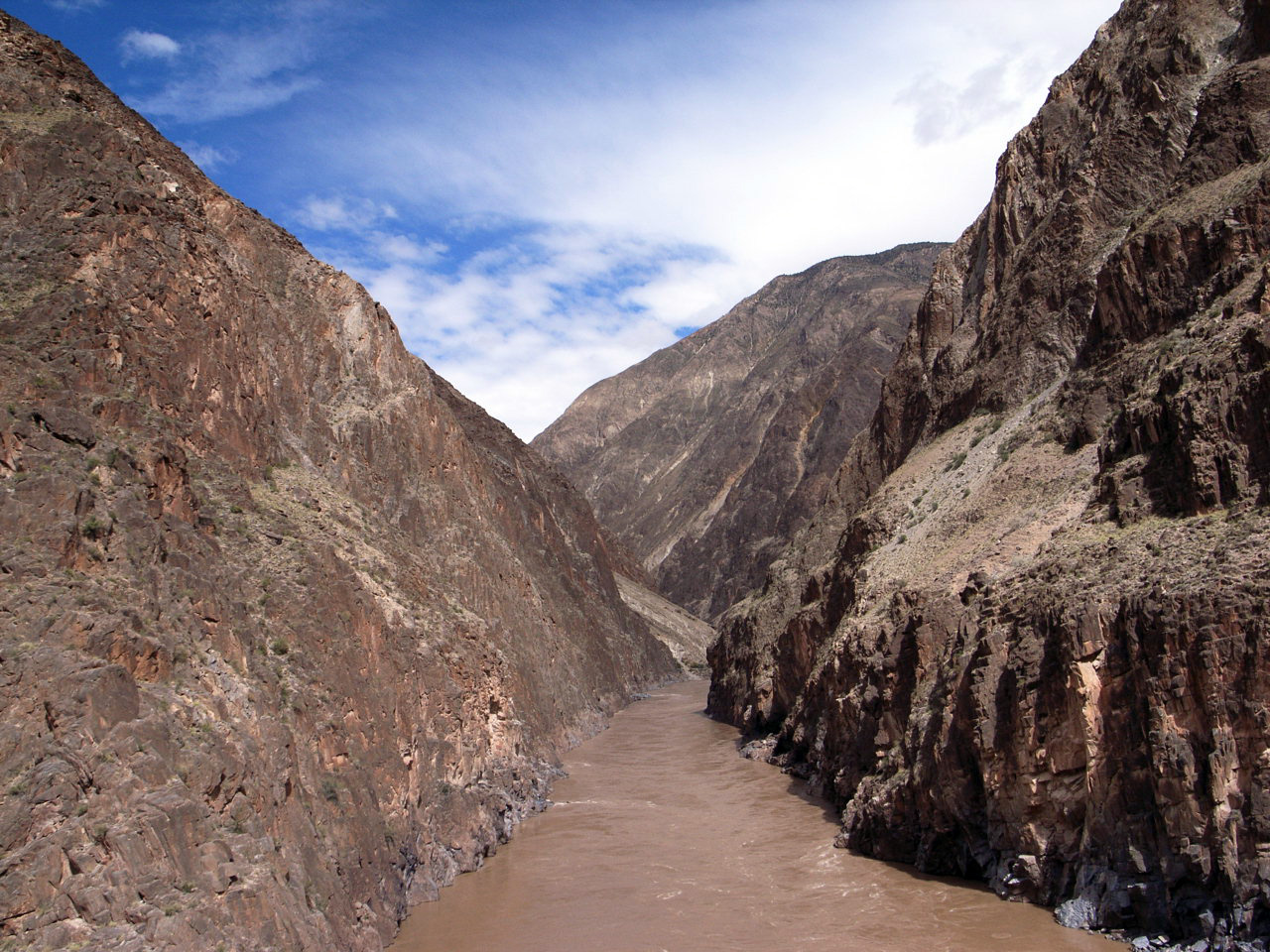
Nu River (Salween)

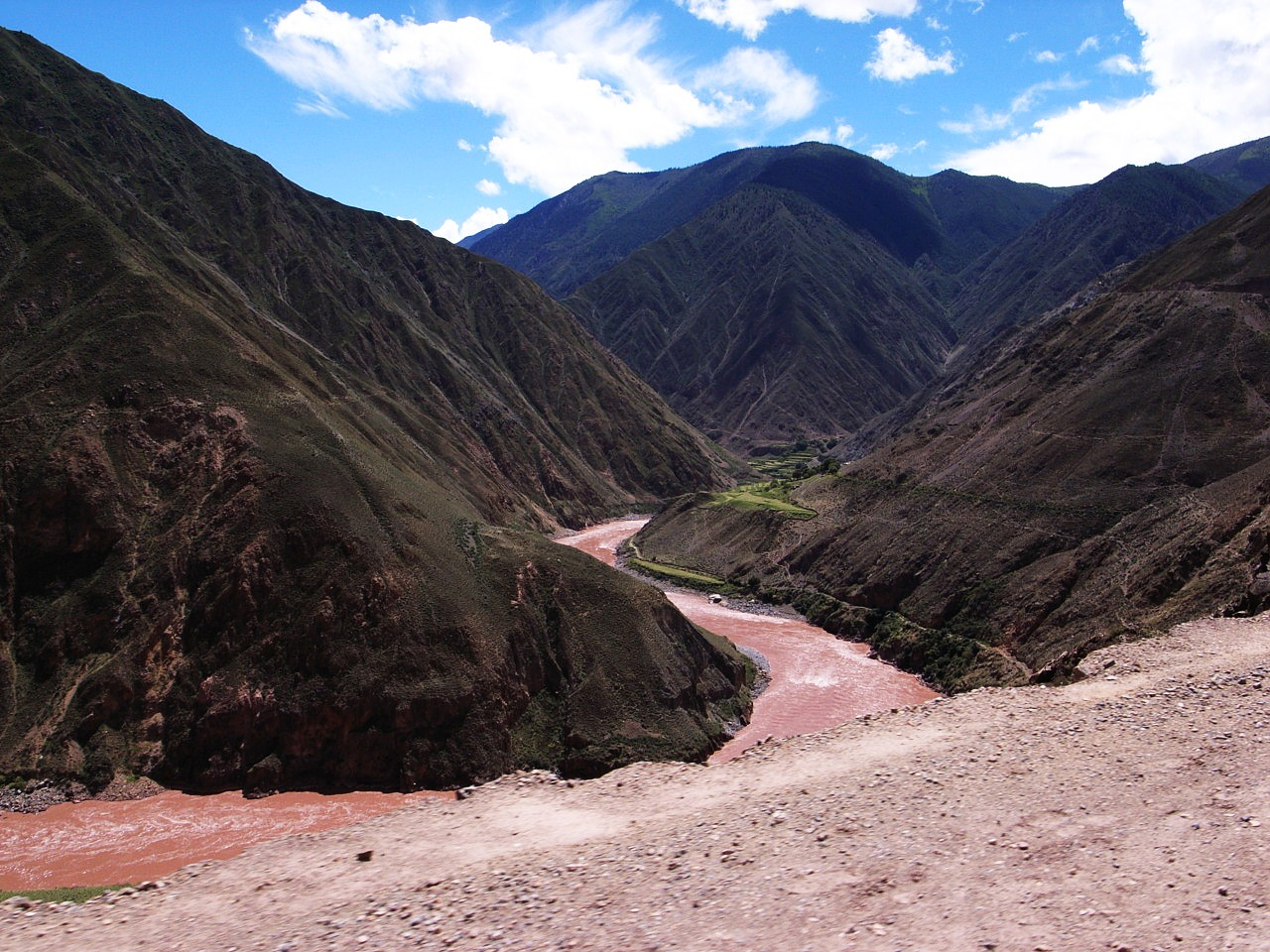
Lancang River (Mekong)

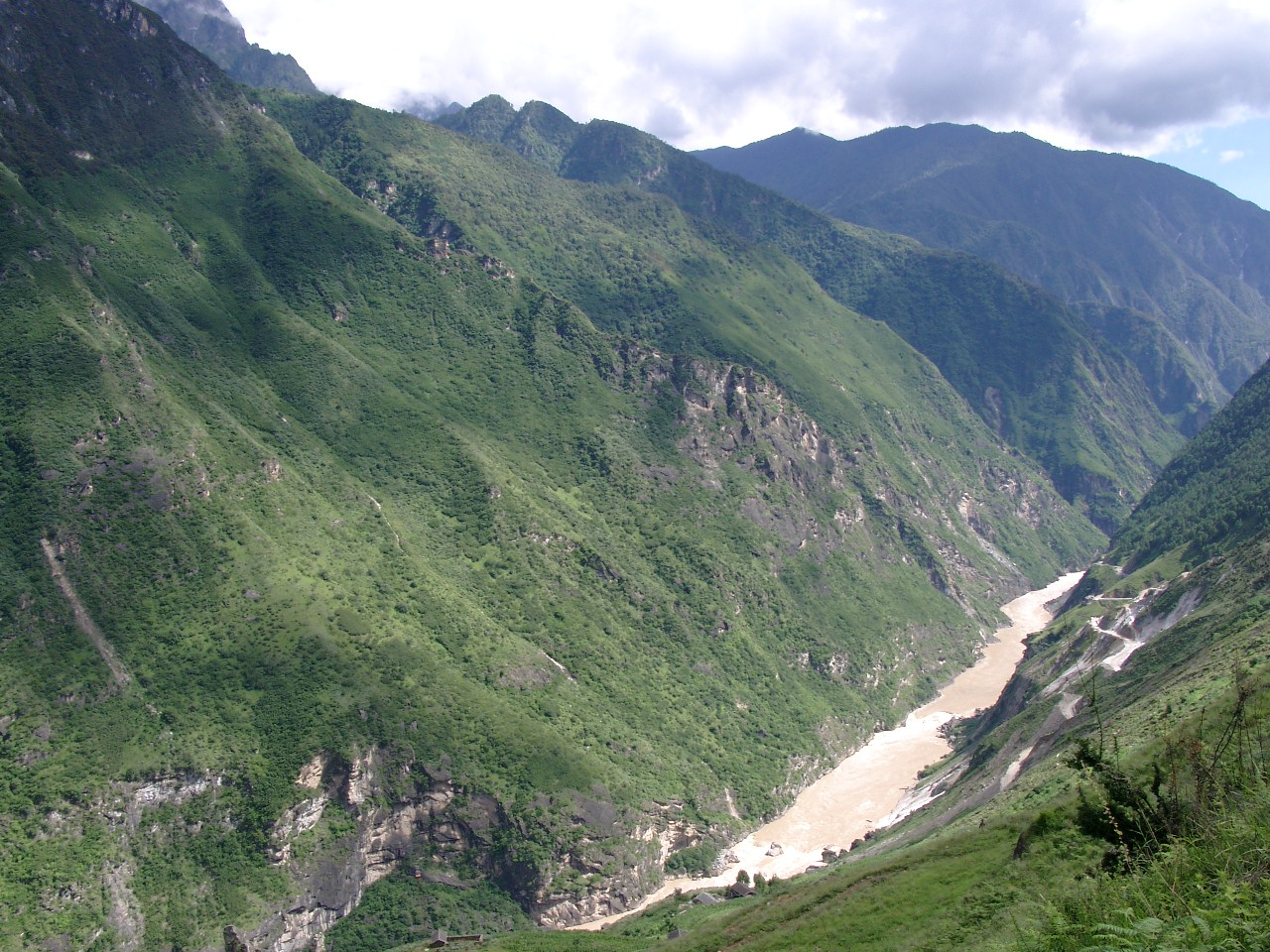
Jinsha River (Yangtze)

== Protected areas ==
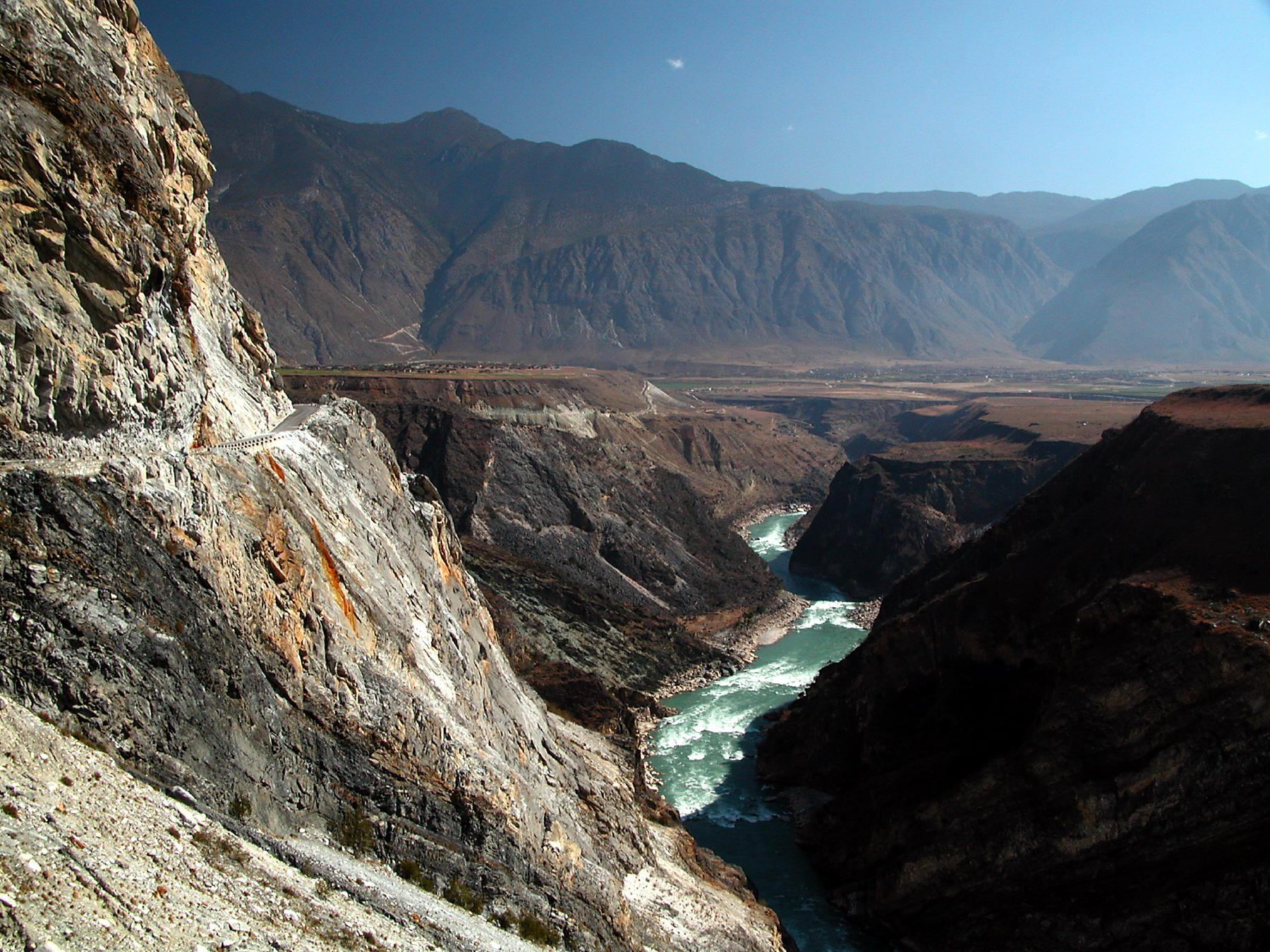
The upper reaches of the Yangtze River, bearing north having just emerged from the Tiger Leaping Gorge

The Three Parallel Rivers of Yunnan Protected Areas consists of fifteen protected areas, in eight geographic clusters. The areas include:

- The three separate sections of the Gaoligongshan National Nature Reserve
- Haba Xueshan Nature Reserve, with the Tiger Leaping Gorge
- Shangri-La County
- Yunling Nature Reserve
- Gongshan Scenic Area
- Yueliangshan Scenic Area in Fugong County (also known as Stone Moon mountain)
- Pianma Scenic Area in Lushui County
- Baima-Meili Xue Shan—Meili Snow mountain range Reserve, with the highest peak, at 6,740 metres (22,110 ft), of the protected areas.
- Julong Lake Scenic Area, in Deqin County
- Laowoshan Scenic Area, in Fugong County
- Hongshan Scenic Area, part of Pudacuo National Park in Shangri-La County
- Qianhushan (Thousand Lake Mountain) Scenic Area, in Shangri-La County
- Laojunshan Scenic Area, in Lanping Bai and Pumi Autonomous County

== Flora and fauna ==
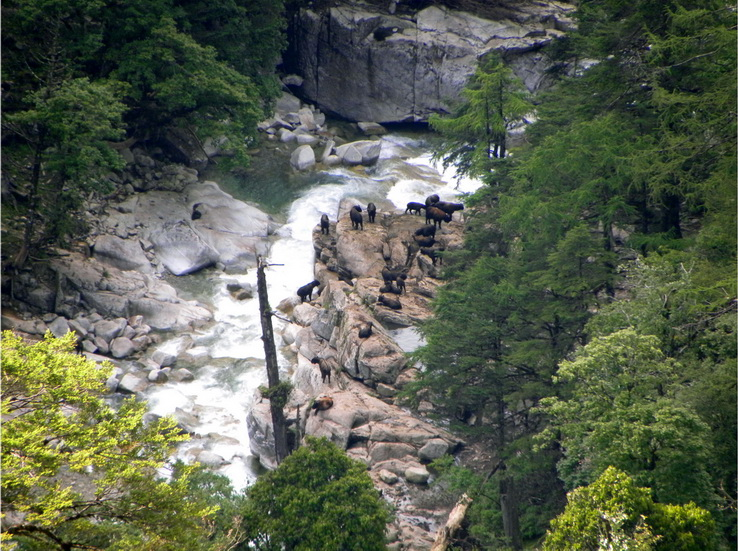
A herd of takin in Gongshan Derung and Nu Autonomous County

In its description of the Three Parallel Rivers, UNESCO mentions: "(It) may be the most biologically diverse temperate region on earth".

The protected areas are home to around 6,000 species of plants, 173 species of mammals, and 417 species of birds. Many of the flora and fauna species are endemic to the region.

=== Flora ===
The protected terrestrial ecoregion areas of this biodiversity hotspot are for a large part covered with both temperate coniferous and broadleaf forests. The protected areas are home to around 6,000 species of plants, many of which are endemic to the region. More than 200 varieties of rhododendron and more than 100 species of gentians and primulas are found in the areas.

=== Fauna ===
The fauna found in the areas includes 173 species of mammals, of which 81 are endemic, and 417 species of birds, of which 22 are endemic. Some of the mammals which inhabit these regions are the endemic black snub-nosed monkey, the Indian leopard, snow leopard, and clouded leopard; the Gaoligong pika, Gongshan muntjac, Chinese shrew mole, and capped langur; the stump-tailed macaque, Asiatic wild dog, black musk deer, and takin; the smooth-coated otter, hoolock gibbon, Asian black bear and red panda.

Rare bird species in the areas include chestnut-throated partridge, the Lady Amherst's pheasant, white-eared pheasant, Yunnan nuthatch, and giant nuthatch; the white-speckled laughingthrush, ferruginous duck, Severtzov's grouse, and brown-winged parrotbill; the Ward's trogon, black-necked crane and Verreaux's monal-partridge.

== See also ==
- Gaoligongshan National Nature Reserve
- Chushi Gangdruk
- List of ecoregions in China
- Temperate broadleaf and mixed forest - terrestrial biome
- Temperate coniferous forest - terrestrial biome
- List of World Heritage Sites in Asia
- Episode "Shangri-La" of the BBC nature documentary Wild China
- Pierre Jean Marie Delavay, a French Catholic missionary and botanist who explored the region in the late 19th century
- Joseph Rock, Austrian-American explorer and botanist who described the region in "Through the Great River Trenches of Asia: National Geographic Society Explorer Follows the Yangtze, Mekong, and Salwin Through Mighty Gorges" (1926)
