= Lama language (Bai) =

Bai language spoken in China

Lama
- Native to: China
- Region: Southwestern China
- Ethnicity: Lama Bai
- Native speakers: 80,000 (2017)
- Language family: Sino-Tibetan: Sinitic?; Macro-Bai?; Bai; Northern Bai; Lama

Language codes
- ISO 639-3: lay
- Glottolog: (insufficiently attested or not a distinct language) lama1289
- ELP: Lama (shared)

Lama is a Bai language spoken along the Lancang River (upper Mekong) in Lanping County and Weixi County, in western Yunnan, China.

Up to the 16th edition of Ethnologue (2009), the code lay was assigned to "Lama (Myanmar)", listed in the index of languages by C. F. Voegelin and F. M. Voegelin (1977) as a Nungish language of Myanmar having 3,000 speakers. In 2013 the reference name for the code was changed to "Bai, Lama", identifying one of two Northern Bai languages, the other being Panyi Bai.
