= The Archives of the Languages of the World =

Sound recordings and documentation by the Indiana University

Coordinates: 39°09′55″N 86°31′11″W

The Archives of the Languages of the World is a collection of sound recordings and documentation held at the Archives of Traditional Music at Indiana University, Bloomington, focused on documenting endangered languages around the world, particularly from the Americas. The collection is also known as the C.F. and F.M. Voegelin Archives of the Languages of the World.

== History ==
The Archives of the Languages of the World was founded by Charles F. Voegelin and Erminie Wheeler Voegelin after the Conference on Archiving held during the 1953 Summer Linguistic Institute hosted by the Linguistics Society of America and Indiana University in Bloomington. They had both been students of Alfred Kroeber at Berkeley, and both did post-doctoral work with Edward Sapir at Yale and they inherited an approach that was in part comparative, and in part grounded in Boasian ethnography. The recordings in the Archive reflected that approach. The Archives gathered recordings beginning in 1953 through the 1970s, with significant financial support from the Ford Foundation starting in 1957. The Archives documented their acquisitions initially in the International Journal of American Linguistics and later published their research in the journal Anthropological Linguistics, which Charles' second wife, the linguist Florence M. Voegelin, founded and edited from 1959 to 1987. Florence took over the management of the archive soon after its founding and the growing collections in the Archives provided a way for scholars to develop a comparative understanding of languages, particularly those of indigenous peoples of North and South America, about which much remained unknown at that time. The collections in the Archives were made by anthropologists, linguists, and folklorists, several of whom were students of Charles Voegelin. Though it never achieved this goal, the Archives intended to acquire sound recordings of all of the extant languages of the world and then catalog, index, and transcribe those recordings. The Voegelins saw the purpose of the Archives as serving not only comparative morphological studies in linguistics but also ethnolinguistics and folklore, and thus the collections document spoken word lists as well as traditional narratives and songs.

Charles Voegelin helped establish the Field Station for Ethnography and Linguistics in conjunction with Northern Arizona University in Flagstaff at which linguists and graduate students in anthropology and linguistics could spend a summer working with indigenous communities in the area. Hopi language and culture was a particular focus of the Field Station and it resulted in a significant number of Hopi collections in the Archives. The Voegelins visited the Field Station each summer and contributed a large number of the collections that were made as part of their own linguistic research. The Voegelins also arranged for speakers of indigenous languages to spend a visiting semester at Indiana University working with graduate students and faculty and these individuals were typically recorded speaking vocabulary and other types of utterances which were then added to the Archives' collections for reference and research. Numerous graduate students worked with the collections in the Archives and helped in its organization and processing. The collections in the Archives were a critical resource for the Voegelins magnum opus, Classification and Index of the World's Languages, published in 1977. Florence M. Voegelin was Senior Archivist/Director for the collections from 1954 until 1979. Martha B. Kendall served as the Senior Archivist after Florence until the transfer of the collections to the Archives of Traditional Music in the summer of 1985. The Voegelins moved to Hawaii following Charles' retirement from Indiana University in 1976 and though they continued to work on linguistic projects and the journal for a few more years, the Archives of the Languages of the World was effectively moribund, with no new additions from that point. By moving the collections to the Archives of Traditional Music, it joined other linguistic and language collections from around the world in the larger archive and the Archives of Traditional Music continues to accept linguistically oriented field collections.

Preservation of the sound recordings in the archives was made possible through the support of federal grants in the mid-1980s, and digital preservation of the sound recordings was conducted between 2016 and 2019 by Indiana University's Media Digitization and Preservation Initiative. The Archives of Traditional Music is currently working to make these recordings available online through Media Collections Online.

== Scope and holdings ==
More than 300 languages or language groups are represented in the 207 field collections of the Archives. Many of the languages documented in the Archives are endangered or moribund. The collection consists of approximately 2350 recordings on tape and 275 recordings on instantaneous discs made between the 1930s and the mid-1970s. The collections consist of linguistic documentation such as recordings of word lists, vocabulary elicitations, discussions of grammar, and narratives, and these recordings are accompanied by indexes, transcriptions, and published articles resulting from the analysis of the field research.

== Searching the holdings ==
Holdings of the Archives of the Languages of the World are cataloged at the collection level and can be found by searching the Indiana University online library catalog with an author search of "Indiana University Bloomington. Archives of the Languages of the World". A print catalog and finding aid for the collections in the Archives of the Languages of the World was created in 1988 by staff of the Archives of Traditional Music and the Indiana University Department of Anthropology.
