= The Erminie Wheeler-Voegelin Collection =

Coordinates: 39.1699°N 86.5258°W

The Erminie Wheeler-Voegelin Collection comprises documents and other scholarly materials gathered by Erminie Wheeler-Voegelin, a pioneer in ethnohistory, in the 1950s. It is housed within the James H. Kellar Library of the Glenn A. Black Laboratory of Archaeology in Bloomington, Indiana. Notes by Glenn A. Black, James H. Kellar, Warren K. Moorehead and Eli Lilly, and other Midwestern archaeologists are open to scholars and to the public for on-site research. The highlight of the collection is the Great Lakes-Ohio Valley Ethnohistory Collection.

== The Great Lakes-Ohio Valley Ethnohistory Collection ==
The Great Lakes-Ohio Valley Ethnohistory Collection (GLOVE) is a unique assemblage of primary and secondary resources pertaining to the Native American occupancy of the region. It was collected by Wheeler-Voegelin in the 1950s, and was funded by the U.S. Department of Justice to prepare in depth reports concerning American Indian land use and tenure. These reports were intended to be used in the government's defense against cases involving alleged treaty inequities and which were brought before the Indian Claims Commission, a body and a process authorized by federal legislation signed into law on August 13, 1946. This collection allows a focus on American Indian land use and occupancy, and provides resources to researchers interested in American Indian or colonial history topics.

== Research use and catalog ==
The collection is open Monday-Friday from 10 a.m. to 4 p.m., though appointments are recommended to be made in advance. Resources must be studied in-house and use must follow strict guidelines. Photocopies are allowed at the discretion of the librarian or archivist present. An online catalog of the collection is in-progress.
