= Walam Olum =

Purported Lenape historical narrative

The Walam Olum, Walum Olum or Wallam Olum, usually translated as "Red Record" or "Red Score", is purportedly a historical narrative of the Lenape (Delaware) Native American tribe. The document has provoked controversy as to its authenticity since its publication in the 1830s by botanist and antiquarian Constantine Samuel Rafinesque. Ethnographic studies in the 1980s and analysis in the 1990s of Rafinesque's manuscripts have concluded that the document is not an authentic Lenape text.

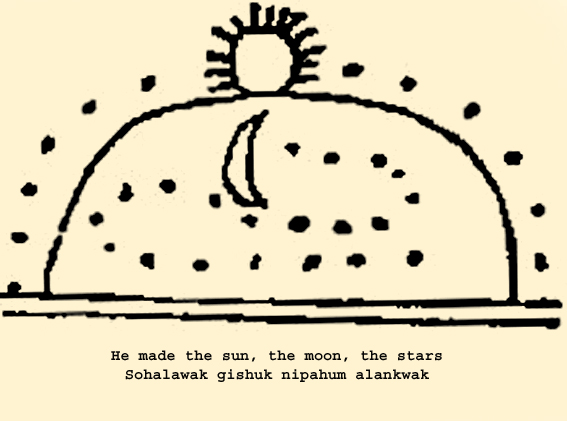
Walam Olum pictograph

== The work ==
In 1836 in his first volume of The American Nations, Rafinesque published what he represented as an English translation of the entire text of the Walam Olum, as well as a portion in the Lenape language.

The text included a long list of chiefs' names, which appears to provide a timescale for the epic. According to Rafinesque, the chiefs appeared as early as 1600 BCE.

=== The story in summary ===
The narrative begins with the formation of the universe, the shaping of the Earth, and the creation of the first people, by the Great Manitou. Then, as the Great Manitou creates more creatures, an evil Manitou creates others, such as flies. Although all is harmonious at first, an evil magician brings unhappiness, sickness, disasters and death. A great snake attacks the people and drove them from their homes. The snake floods the land and makes monsters in the water, but the Creator makes a giant turtle, on which the surviving people ride out the flood and pray for the waters to recede. When land emerges again, the people are in a place of snow and cold, so they develop the skills of house-building and hunting, and begin explorations to find more temperate lands. Eventually, they choose to head east from the land of the Turtle to the land of the Snake, walking across the frozen ocean and first reaching a land of spruce trees.

After a few generations (from this point on, chiefs of the tribe are named), the people begin to spread into the adjoining territories. Many generations pass. (The characteristics of each chief are briefly described.) Then, a large part of the nation decides to invade the territory of the Talegawi people, with the help of the northern Talamatan. The invasion succeeds. The Talamatan later become hostile, but are quickly subdued, and a further long period of consolidation begins. Slow expansion into the rich eastern lands eventually reaches another sea, where, after generations, the first white men arrive in ships.

There the text ends, though Rafinesque did publish an additional "Fragment: On the History of the Linapis since abt. 1600, when the Wallamolum closes," which takes the story up to his own time. This (which incidentally names the composer of the original Walam Olum as one Lekhibit) exists only as a purported translation by John Burns, who has himself never been satisfactorily identified.

== Provenance ==
Rafinesque claimed the original narrative was recorded in pictographs on birch bark, or cedar wood tablets or sticks (Rafinesque explained that "Olum ... implies a record, a notched stick, an engraved piece of wood or bark.") He said "the late Dr. Ward of Indiana" acquired the materials in 1820 from a Lenape patient in return for a medical cure, and eventually passed them on to Rafinesque. From Rafinesque's personal notes and a family legend, this Dr. Ward was tentatively identified in 1954 as Dr. John Russell Ward, a Kentucky physician who died in 1834, but a potential Indiana candidate has been identified: Malthus A. Ward (1794–1863, so not "late" in the sense of "deceased") who spent some of his early career in Indiana, moved to New England in 1823 and from 1831 was professor of natural history at the University of Georgia. He said the explanatory transcription of verses in the Lenape language came from a different source, in 1822. After his translation was published, Rafinesque said he lost the actual plaques.

When Rafinesque wrote an essay on the Lenape language in October 1834, he did not mention the Walam Olum at all. It was two months later that he submitted a supplement about it. This was shortly after he acquired a list of authentic Lenape names compiled by John Heckewelder.

Rafinesque's translation of the 183 verses totals fewer than 3,000 words. In his manuscript he juxtaposed the pictographs with the verses in Lenape language that explained them. This material is now held at the University of Pennsylvania and has been digitized. Any items in Rafinesque's large collection of specimens, which did not find a ready sale after his death were apparently destroyed. There is no evidence other than Rafinesque's testimony that the original sticks existed. Scholars have only his work to study.

Twentieth-century archaeology has confirmed that by Rafinesque's time, Native Americans had been using birch bark scrolls for over 200 years. In 1965 the archaeologist Kenneth Kidd reported on two finds of "trimmed and fashioned pieces of birch bark on which have been scratched figures of animals, birds, men, mythological creatures, and esoteric symbols" in the Head-of-the-Lakes region of Ontario. Some of these resembled scrolls used by the Mide Society of the Ojibwa. A scroll from one of these finds was later dated to about 1560 +/-70 CE.

== The Walam Olum in the 19th century ==
While there was controversy about the Walam Olum, it was treated as an accurate account by historians, anthropologists, and archaeologists for many years. Ephraim G. Squier, widely regarded as an influential figure of American 19th-century archaeology, republished the text in 1849. He accepted it as genuine, partially on internal evidence but also because the educated Indian chief (Kah-ge-ga-gah-bowh) (George Copway), to whom he showed the manuscript, "unhesitatingly pronounced it authentic, in respect not only to the original signs and accompanying explanations in the Delaware dialect, but also in the general ideas and conceptions which it embodies. He also bore testimony to the fidelity of the translation." More recently, Barnhart noted that Copway was "fluent in his native dialect and knowledgeable of the traditions of the Ojibwa and other Algonquian groups such as the Lenape, but he was certainly not an expert on the traditions and language of the Delaware." On February 16, 1849, after the documented was republished, Henry Rowe Schoolcraft wrote to Squier that he believed the document is "well sustained by comparisons with such transcripts as I have obtained from bark scrolls, and the tabular pieces of wood called music boards".

Other notable Indigenous authorities also spoke favorably of the Walam Olum as a legitimate Indigenous text other than George Copway, including the Delaware Reverend Albert Anthony, and the Munsee chief Gottlieb Tobias of Moraviantown.

In 1885, after the third printing, the well-known ethnographer Daniel G. Brinton published a new translation of the text. Brinton explained, "In several cases the figures or symbols appear to me to bear out the corrected translations which I have given of the lines, and not that of Rafinesque. This, it will be observed, is an evidence, not merely that he must have received this text from other hands, but the figures also, and weighs heavily in favor of the authentic character of both."

The 1885 edition may have been read by ethnographer and explorer James Mooney. Published in 1900, his Myths of the Cherokee references the Walum Olum. In his "Historical sketch of the Cherokee" at the beginning of the work he attempts to adduce the origins of the term 'Cherokee:' "... among other synonyms for the tribe are Rickahockan or Rechahecrian, the ancient Powhatan name, and Tallige', or Tallige'wi, the ancient name used in the Walam Olum chronicle of the Lenape'."

== The Walam Olum in the 20th century ==
In the 1930s, Erminie Voegelin attempted to find evidence of Walam Olum narrative elements in independent Lenni-Lenape and Delaware sources; the parallels were at best inconclusive. Doubts about the text's authenticity began to grow. In 1952 renowned archaeologist James Bennett Griffin publicly announced that he had no confidence in the 'Walam Olum' when he withdrew from an academic task force on the subject.

Historian William A. Hunter also believed the text a hoax. In 1954 archaeologist John G. Witthoft found linguistic inaccuracies and suspicious correspondences of words in the texts to 19th-century Lenape-English word lists. He concluded that Rafinesque composed the narrative from Lenape texts already in print. The following year, he announced in the Journal of American Linguistics the start of a Walam Olum project for further study, but this project did not take place.

In 1954, a multidisciplinary team of scholars from the Indiana Historical Society published another translation and commentary. They stated, "The 'Red Score' is a worthy subject for students of aboriginal culture." A reviewer noted that the team was not able to identify Dr. Ward, and he concluded that the document's origins "are undeniably clouded". Anthropologist Della Collins Cook commented on the 1954 study, "The scholarly essays are best read as exercises in stating one's contradictory conclusions in a manner designed to give as little offense as possible to one's sponsor." Other translations and commentaries have followed, including translations into languages other than English.

Selwyn Dewdney, art educator and researcher into Ojibwa art and anthropology, wrote the only comprehensive study of the Ojibwa birch bark scrolls (wiigwaasabakoon). In it he wrote: "A surviving pictographic record on wood, preserved by the Algonquian-speaking Delaware long after they had been shifted from their original homeland on Atlantic shores at the mouth of the Delaware River, offers evidence of how ancient and widespread is the myth of a flood (see Deluge (mythology)) involving a powerful water manitou. The record is known as the Walum Olum (Painted Sticks), and was interpreted for George Copway by a Delaware Elder ... Apart from the reference to man's moral wickedness, the mood and imagery of the Walum Olum convey an archaic atmosphere that surely predates European Influence." A review of his study by the anthropologist Edward S Rogers states "Dewdney is apt to rely upon ethnographic generalizations that were in vogue a quarter of a century ago, but in the intervening years have been modified or disproven ... Dewdney handles ethnohistorical matters no better than he does ethnographic topics ... Dewdney has deceived the unwary that do not realize that the exact distributions and certain proposed migrations of Ojibwa still remain unresolved. A final word, but one that is of paramount importance, must be voiced. How will the Ojibwa react to this book? Most likely, negatively, from the few comments received to date. The fact that "Sacred" information is being divulged will be resented."

Indigenous organizations and prominent individuals continued to speak for the Walam Olum as a legitimate text through this period, including the Delaware writer Richard C. Adams, the Munsee-Delaware chief Joseph Montour, the Delaware Tribe of Indians (by a 1980 resolution, withdrawn in 1997), the Delaware Nation, and Linda Poolaw, grand chief of the Delaware Nation Grand Council of North America.

By the 1980s, however, ethnologists had collected enough independent information "to discount the Walam olum completely as a tradition". Herbert C. Kraft, an expert on the Lenape, had long suspected the document to be a fraud. He stated that it did not square with the archaeological record of migrations by the prehistoric ancestors of the Lenape. In addition, he cited a 1985 survey conducted among Lenape elders by ethnologists David M. Oestreicher and James Rementer that revealed traditional Lenape had never heard of the narrative. The older Lenape people said that they "found its text puzzling and often incomprehensible." Oestreicher examined the Lenape language text with fluent native speaker, Lucy Parks Blalock, and they found problems such as frequent use of English idioms.

In 1991 Steven Williams summarized the history of the case and the evidence against the document, lumping it with many other famous archaeological frauds. The existence of genuine historic pictogram documents elsewhere does not overcome the textual and ethnological problems of the Walam Olum.

Kentucky-based writer Joe Napora wrote a modern translation of the text, which was published in 1992. In his preface, he wrote, "My belief is that the Walam Olum is closely related to the Mide Scrolls that Dewdney wrote so eloquently about in 'Sacred Scrolls of the Ojibway.'"

== The Walam Olum since 1994 ==
In 1994, and afterwards, textual evidence that the Walam Olum was not authentic was supplied by David M. Oestreicher in "Unmasking the Walam Olum: A 19th Century Hoax". Oestreicher examined Rafinesque's original manuscript and "found it replete with crossed-out Lenape words that had been replaced with others that better matched his English 'translation.' In other words, Rafinesque had been translating from English to Lenape, rather than the other way round".

In general, he found a variety of evidence that the Walam Olum was not an authentic historical record but was composed by someone having only a slight familiarity with the Lenape language. Oestreicher argued that Rafinesque crafted the linguistic text from specific sources on the Delaware Language published by the American Philosophical Society and elsewhere. Further, he said that the supposedly "Lenape" pictographs were hybrids from published Egyptian, Chinese, and Mayan sources. Barnhart concurs, stating that "the pictographs are in no way comparable to the figures found on the stone carvings or petroglyphs found in Lenapehoking, the traditional homeland of the Lenape. David Oestreicher asserted that the stories were a conglomerate assembled from numerous sources from different cultures that spanned the globe. Barnhart was of the opinion that Rafinesque created the Walam Olum in hopes of winning the international Prix Volney contest hosted in Paris, and Barnhart thought that Rafinesque wanted to prove his long-held theories regarding the peopling of America. While Oestreicher characterizes the Walam Olum as a deliberate and self-serving "hoax" by Rafinesque, there are reasons to think that Rafinesque's motivations may have been more complex and he may himself have been the victim of a hoax.

Oestreicher's very detailed analyses have not found a wide audience, but they have made it possible to go a step further, and study the thinking and cultural assumptions of earlier researchers (for example by examining how they treated features of the Walam Olum which should have been clear evidence that it was a fake). Oestreicher's findings were also summarized by Herbert Kraft in his study, "The Lenape-Delaware Indian Heritage: 10,000 BCE to 2000 CE." Drew Lorenzina argues that even as an apparently inauthentic text, both Rafinesque and later Oestreicher treated the work the same way many colonial writers treated indigenous texts, which would have produced great inaccuracies and problems of interpretation anyway.

According to Andrew Newman, the first time Oestreicher's analysis and recognition that the text was inauthentic reached the general public was when this Wikipedia page was created in 2006.

A recent biography of Rafinesque concluded: "There is now very good reason to believe that he fabricated important data and documents ... The most egregious example is the Lenni Lenape migration saga, 'Walam Olum', which has perplexed scholars for one and a half centuries. Rafinesque wrote the 'Walam Olum' believing it to be authentic because it accorded with his own belief—he was merely recording and giving substance to what must be true. It was a damaging, culpably dishonest act, which misled scholars in search of the real truth, far more damaging than his childish creations, which could be easily dismissed; this was more than mischief."

Many traditional Lenape believe they have lived in their homeland (that is, in the New Jersey, Pennsylvania, and New York area) forever. Any items in Rafinesque's large collection of specimens, which did not find a ready sale after his death were apparently destroyed.

The Delaware Tribe of Indians, located in eastern Oklahoma, originally endorsed the document but withdrew their endorsement on February 11, 1997, after reviewing the evidence. Whilst concluding that the burden of proof lies on those who believe the Walam Olum to be authentic, Barnhart states that "whatever one's position on the 'Walam Olum', its controversial place in the history of American anthropology is most definitively secured."

== See also ==
- Birch bark document
- Epigraphy
- Ideogram
- Mi'kmaq hieroglyphic writing
- Midewiwin
- Paleography
- Papyrology
- Writing System
