= Anthropological Linguistics =

Anthropological Linguistics may refer to:

- Anthropological linguistics, the subfield of linguistics and anthropology
- Anthropological Linguistics (journal)
