= Nowlin Mound =

Nowlin Mound is a pre-contact mound site in eastern Indiana in Dearborn County. It is one of the first systematically excavated mounds in the state of Indiana, and the proceedings were well documented by Glenn A. Black, who led the team of Midwestern archaeologists.

While the earliest investigations at the site by antiquarians occurred in 1870s, the first official excavation began June 23, 1934.

== 1934 Season ==
The team staked off the area at the beginning of the season, and dug the first 70-foot trench. Excavations found pottery sherds and a corner notched projectile point, among other artifacts. The archaeologists dug several other 20- to 30-foot trenches, all with vertical faces. The next 30- to 40-foot trench dug revealed the log-lined East Tomb and several artifacts; the team built a roof overhead to protect the site as excavations continued. Soon after, the Central Tomb was discovered, also log-lined but without artifacts.

== 1935 Season ==
The second season began June 17, 1935, during which time excavations focused on the Central Tomb, revealing another burial. A 100- to 110-foot trench revealed Tomb 4, which contained fragments of human bone. Black wrote with regret that it had been damaged by the surrounding excavations. Soon after, they discovered Tomb 5, which also contained human burials, pieces of bark, and beads.

Completion of another 110-foot trench revealed the West Log Tomb, with evidence that twigs, sticks, and grass had been burned on the floor. An intrusive tomb, the seventh discovered, appeared to have been placed in Nowlin Mound after the completion of the structure.

== Artifacts Found ==
The team recovered several artifacts, which into two categories: those purposefully placed within burials, and those that had been disturbed by excavations and were considered chance deposits. Glenn Black recorded that the majority of artifacts, 60%, were recovered in the first season. Artifacts included antler tines, beads, beaver teeth, bone awls, copper, and various types of knives. They also found limestone shards, pottery, slate, and bits of white clay. James B. Griffin reports that the pottery was tempered with crushed limestone, and colors varied from red to brown to yellow.

== Future Efforts ==
Artifacts recovered from Nowlin Mounds excavations now reside at the Glenn A. Black Laboratory of Archaeology. Any human ancestral remains and associated funerary objects will eventually be repatriated to federally recognized tribes, in accordance with the Native American Graves Protection and Repatriation Act.
