= Albert Anthony =

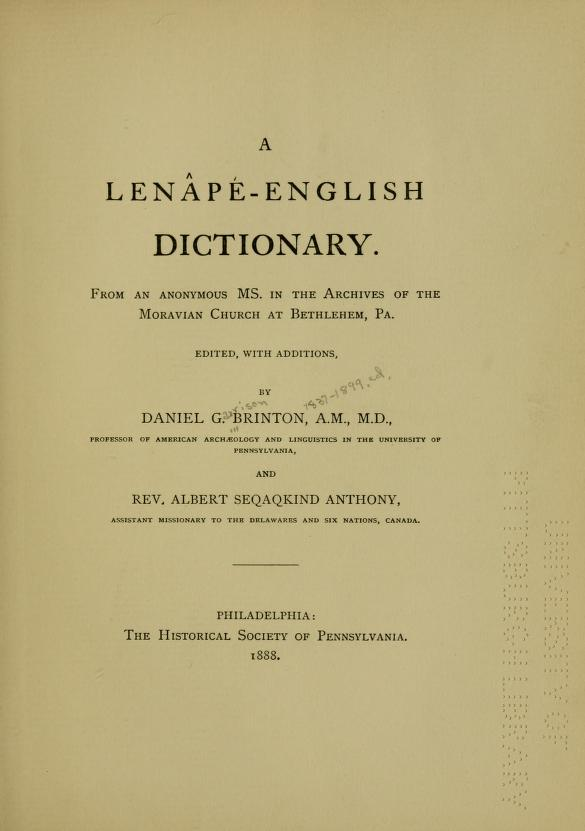
A Lenape-English dictionary published in 1888

Albert Seqaqkind Anthony (born ca. 1839) was a Lenape missionary and scholar of the Six Nations of the Grand River in Ontario, Canada. He served as an interpreter between his native Munsee language, English, and Iroquoian languages, and assisted Oronhyatekha with a vocabulary of Munsee/Lenape in 1865.

Anthony graduated as an Anglican priest from Huron University College in 1873, and worked as a missionary with the New England Company. He visited Buffalo, New York for the Forest Lawn Cemetery reinterment of Red Jacket in 1884.

Anthony retired as a priest in 1886, after being employed as a farmer, and subsequently worked with Daniel Garrison Brinton on a dictionary of Munsee/Lenape, visiting Brinton in Philadelphia in 1886 and 1887 in his ancestral Delaware Valley, and Brinton also consulted with him on the Walam Olum, which he believed to be genuine. Anthony is the source of the etymology of Manhattan, which was named after a stand of hickory trees used for bows in the south of Manhattan.
