= Indiana University Museum of Archaeology and Anthropology =

World Cultures

Coordinates: 39°10′12″N 86°31′34″W

Indiana University Museum of Archaeology and Anthropology, July 21, 2026

The Indiana University Museum of Archaeology and Anthropology (IUMAA) is a museum of archaeology and anthropology on the campus of Indiana University Bloomington in Bloomington, Indiana. The museum occupies the same building at 416 N. Indiana Avenue as the former Mathers Museum of World Cultures and the Glenn A. Black Laboratory of Archaeology, which merged into a single institution as part of an extensive renovation, which began in fall 2020. The new museum, which houses the collections of both former institutions, reopened on October 18, 2024.

== History ==
First announced in 1963, the Indiana University Museum was initially funded by the university's departments of History and Anthropology, and the Committee on Folklore. The museum opened its first exhibit in December 1965. Its first director, Dr. Wesley Hurt, set out to expand its holdings through collecting trips in the Western United States and South America, and through actively seeking donations from collectors. By 1970, its collections and exhibits had grown to the point that moving into a new building was a necessity. A new site would provide improved facilities and a significant amount of storage space. This led to the museum staff to apply for accreditation by the American Association of Museums. They were awarded the accreditation in July 1971. In October 1980, the groundbreaking ceremony was held for the new William Hammond Mathers Museum. The institution was named in honor of the youngest son of Dr. Frank C. Mathers, a chemistry professor at IU, and the leading building fund donor for the new location.

While some of the collections acquired by the museum in its first few decades were accompanied by substantial documentation about makers and the uses of these objects, others lacked much contextual information. In later years, staff, faculty, and graduate students associated with the Mathers Museum conducted systematic fieldwork in order to better understand certain donated items, and to develop exhibits around intentionally selected, richly documented materials.

The collections include more than 40,000 ethnographic objects and images from cultures around the world, with areas of specialization including African, Latin American, and Native American cultures, musical instruments, and Indiana History.

Traditional Arts Indiana, the state's traditional arts program, became part of the museum 2015, before moving to IU's Cook Center for Public Arts and Humanities in 2020. While based at the Mathers, Traditional Arts Indiana director Jon Kay collaborated with Mathers staff on research, presentations, performances, and exhibits, including Creative Aging, was based on Kay's 2016 book Folk Art and Aging..

Some notable holdings of the museum include the Stevens-Esarey collection of everyday tools from the 19th century; West African materials collected by Roy Sieber and Arnold Rubin; the Ellison collection of Native American materials; Pacific artifacts and Hendricksville pottery donated by Henry and Cecilia Wahl; John White's collection of hundreds of objects from the Tetela people of the Congo; the Laura Boulton collection of musical instruments from around the world; an extensive selection of everyday objects from the Caboclos assembled by the museum in collaboration with IU anthropologists Eduardo Bronizio and Andrea Siqueira; nearly 200 items associated with botánicas gathered by folklorist Selina Morales for the exhibit Botánica: A Pharmacy for the Soul (2008–2009); African ceramics donated by William Simmons; regalia associated with central African royalty collected by Allen Davis; pieces by Chester Cornett and other Kentucky chair makers donated by folklorist Michael Own Jones; over 400 West African garments from the collection of Mary Warren; Native American materials from the Great Lakes region bequeathed by Elinor and Vincent Ostrom; works purchased from the Eastern Band of Cherokee Indians' Qualla Arts and Crafts Mutual cooperative; a large airplane-shaped fantasy coffin by Paa Joe Coffin Works in Ghana, donated by Robert and Alice Schloss, and documentary materials and tools from this workshop collected for the museum by Kristin Otto; and documentary materials on traditional arts in China collected by museum staff in connection with the China-US Folklore and Intangible Cultural Heritage Project, a collaboration between several U.S. and Chinese ethnographic museums.
