= Glenn Albert Black =

American archaeologist 1900–1964)

Glenn A. Black
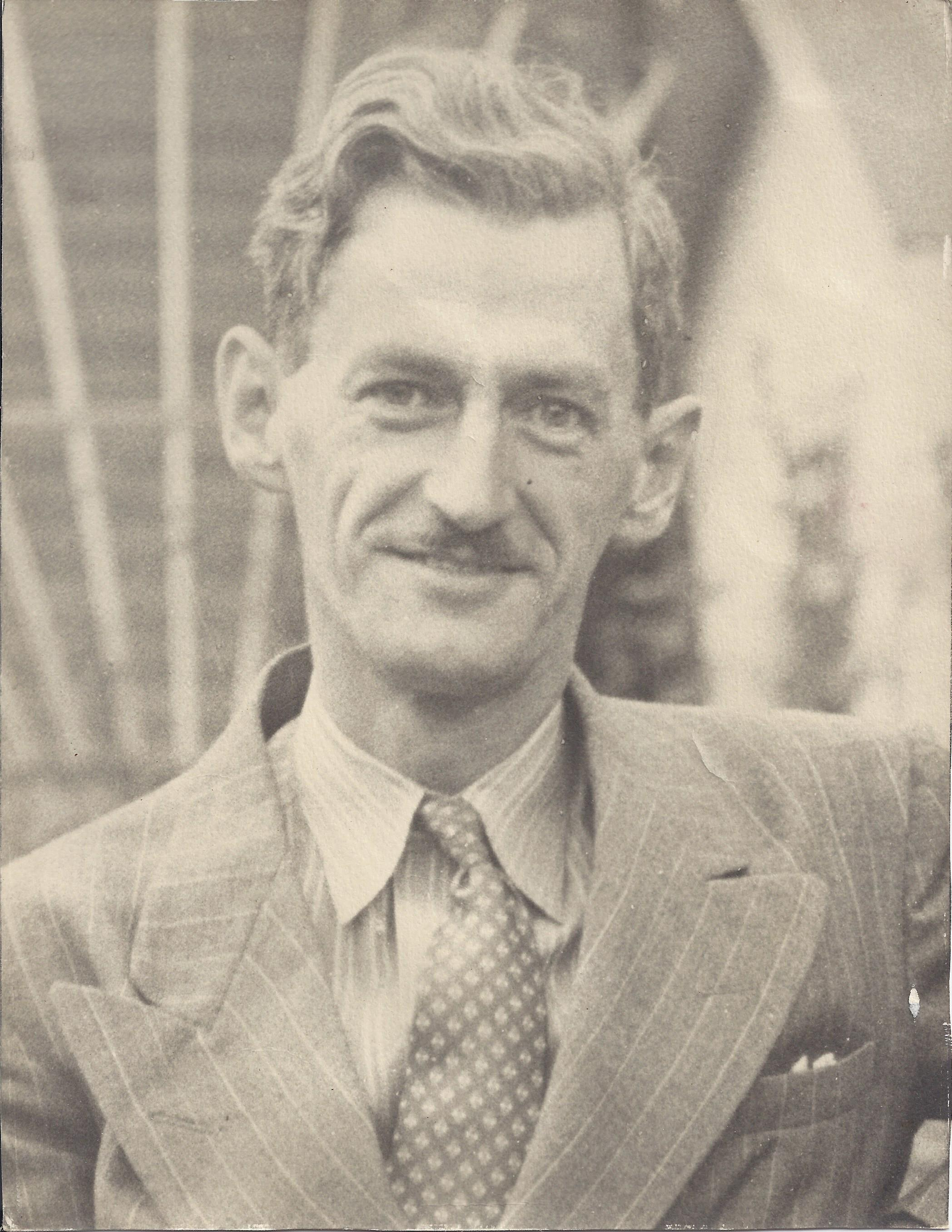
- Black in the late 1930s. (Photo is part of collection donated to the Glenn A. Black Laboratory by the Glenn A. and Ida Black family.)
- Born: Glenn Albert Black; August 18, 1900; Indianapolis, Indiana
- Died: September 2, 1964 (aged 64); Evansville, Indiana
- Occupation: Archaeologist
- Notable work: Angel Site: An Archaeological, Historical and Ethnological Study (1967)
- Spouse: Ida May (Hazzard) Black
- Parent(s): Emma (Kennedy) and John A. Black

Glenn Albert Black (August 18, 1900 –September 2, 1964) was an American archaeologist, author, and part-time university lecturer who was among the first professional archaeologists to study prehistoric sites in Indiana continuously. Black, a pioneer and innovator in developing archaeology field research techniques, is best known for his excavation of Angel Mounds, a Mississippian (A.D. 1050–1450) community near present-day Evansville, Indiana, that he brought to national attention. Angel Mounds was designated a National Historic Landmark in 1964. Black was largely self-taught and began serious work on archaeological sites in Indiana in the 1930s, before there were many training opportunities in archaeology in the United States. He is considered to have been the first full-time professional archaeologist focusing on Indiana's ancient history, and the only professional archaeologist in the state until the 1960s. During his thirty-five-year career as an archaeologist in Indiana, Black also worked as a part-time lecturer at Indiana University Bloomington from 1944 to 1960 and conducted a field school at the Angel site during the summer months.

Black's major public works include "Excavation of the Nowlin Mound: Dearborn County Site 7, 1934-1935" (1936) and the two-volume study, Angel Site: An Archaeological, Historical and Ethnological Study (1967), which was posthumously published. Black received financial support and encouragement for his work from his friend, Eli Lilly. Wabash College awarded him an honorary Doctor of Science degree in 1951. Black, a founding member of the Society for American Archaeology, served as its president (1941–1942), vice president (1939–1940), and treasurer (1947–1951). The Glenn A. Black Laboratory of Archaeology, established in 1965 on the Indiana University campus in Bloomington, Indiana, was named in his honor and dedicated on April 21, 1971; it continues to encourage academic research as the IU Museum of Archaeology and Anthropology, as well as stewarding and exhibiting Indiana's archaeological history.

== Early life and education ==
Glenn Albert Black was born on August 18, 1900, in Indianapolis, Indiana, to Emma (Kennedy) and John A. Black. Glenn's father, a wholesale grocery clerk, died in 1912, when Glenn was about twelve years old. Black attended public schools in Indianapolis and graduated from Arsenal Technical High School in 1916. After high school, he played drums in the Sacramento Syncopators, a traveling Dixieland band. By 1926 Black was working as a cost estimating engineer for Fairbanks, Morse and Company, an industrial scales manufacturer. During his free time, he studied archaeology and the prehistory of Indiana as a hobby. Black visited prehistoric sites around Indiana before volunteering in November 1930 to assist the Indiana Historical Society with archaeological surveys.

As with many archaeologists in the 1910s and 1920s, Black did not attend college. He was largely self-taught. His only formal professional training in archaeology was with Henry C. Shetrone in Columbus, Ohio, at the Ohio State Museum, where he worked from October 1931 to May 1932. Black was awarded an honorary doctor of science degree from Wabash College in 1951.

== Personal life ==
Black and Ida May Hazzard married On October 27, 1931. She shared his interest in archaeology and joined him in the excavations at Nowlin Mound. The couple moved to the Angel Mounds site in the late 1930s.

== Career ==
Most of Black's research took place in Indiana. He began archaeological work in the 1930s, when the field began to mature as a profession and in the years before there were many training opportunities in archaeology in the United States. Although he never attended college and did not earn a degree in archaeology, Black is considered to have been the first full-time professional archaeologist focusing on Indiana's ancient history. He was also the only professional archaeologist in the state until the 1960s. In addition, Black became a well-respected researcher, an Indiana University lecturer, an author, and an authority on the prehistory of Indiana.

=== Early archaeology career ===
Black launched his career as a professional archeologist after volunteering in 1927 at Albee Mound in Sullivan County, Indiana. (Albee Mound was the first professional archaeological excavation in Indiana.) Black also worked on the Whitewater Valley archaeological survey in Indiana in the late 1920s. Both projects were led by Christopher B. Coleman, director of the Indiana Historical Commission (which later became the Indiana Historical Bureau), and J. Arthur MacLean, director of the John Herron Art Institute, and sponsored by the Indiana Historical Society. Through these projects, Black met and befriended Eli Lilly, who became president of Eli Lilly and Company in 1932. Lilly shared Black's interest in Indiana prehistory and financially supported and encouraged Black's archaeological career. Lilly paid for Black's studies in Ohio and initially funded Black's archaeological work in Indiana with his own funds, including Black's salary during his early years at the Indiana Historical Society.

=== Indiana archaeologist ===
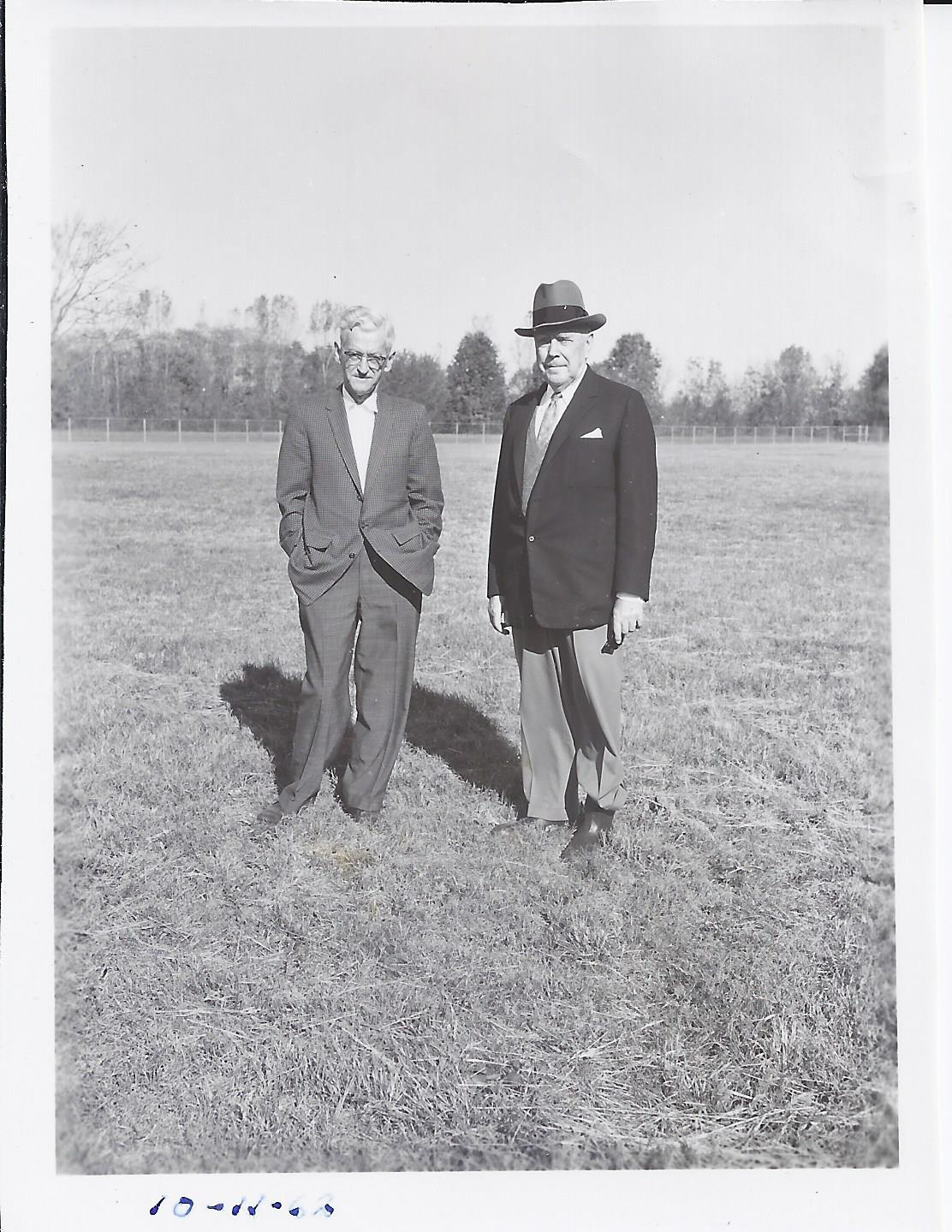
Glenn Black with Eli Lilly. Photo part of a collection donated by the Glenn A. and Ida Black family.

In November 1930, Black wrote to Dr. Coleman to volunteer his services as an archaeologist, and in 1931, when the Fairbanks, Morse and Company relocated to Wisconsin, Black resigned his position in order to stay in Indiana and support his family. In May 1931, the Indiana Historical Society hired Black to serve as a local guide and driver to Warren K. Moorehead, a nationally known archaeologist from Ohio State University and the Peabody Foundation who helped create archaeological programs for the study of the eastern part of the United States; Eli Lilly, who served as the president of the Indiana Historical Society from 1932 to 1947; and E. Y. Guernsey, who did archaeological work for Indiana Historical Society. The purpose of their trip was to assess Indiana archaeological sites. In June 1931, Lilly and the Indiana Historical Society hired Black to continue archaeological work in the state.

Most of Black's thirty-five-years as an archaeologist were spent as the Indiana Historical Society's director of archaeology and its only archaeologist on staff. Black, Lilly, and Paul Weer (one of Lilly's friends), developed a multidisciplinary research program for Indiana in the 1930s. In order to conduct research, Black became proficient in several areas: surveying, cartography, drafting, photography, and geophysics. He also used new technologies and worked with scientists from other fields.

Black traveled the state investigating and reporting on archaeological sites. In the fall of 1931, Moorehead recommended sending Black to Greene County, Indiana, to begin surveys in the area. In October 1931, Black went to Columbus, Ohio, to study the collections at the Ohio State Museum and to receiver further training in field excavations. Black returned to Green County in 1932 to conduct excavations in conjunction with the Indiana Historical Bureau.

In 1933, Black assisted on a survey of Dearborn County, Indiana, and Ohio counties to record sites such as Nowlin Mound. Black also led excavations at Nowlin Mound, his first major project, which began in 1934. His meticulous excavation methods and detailed published report, "Excavation of the Nowlin Mound: Dearborn County Site 7, 1934-1935," written with James Bennett Griffin and Frederick R. Matson Jr., provided a well-documented description of the mound structure. The project also "served as the model for all subsequent excavations on like contexts." The Nowlin Mound report included a history of the mound and details of excavation, including a description of its construction and artifacts. According to James H. Keller, who was Black's biographer, "Probably no more precise description of mound structure is in print than that contained in the Nowlin Mound report."

=== Walam Olum investigations ===
In the 1930s, Black participated in a controversial multidisciplinary investigation of the Walam Olum, a disputed account of the creation of the Delaware (Lenape) tribe. Black contributed a chapter to Walam Olum or Red Score: The Migration Legend of the Lenni Lenape or Delaware Indians: A New Translation, Interpreted by Linguistic, Historical, Archaeological, and Physical Anthropological Studies (1954). His analysis of archaeological data supported the assertion that the Delaware might have been the prehistoric group responsible for the Hopewell culture in the Ohio River valley. To support his claim, Black used early historic documents and maps from the Midwest and the East, much of it unpublished, and without any knowledge of radiocarbon dating for the archaeological sites. James B. Griffin, who reviewed the book in the Indiana Magazine of History, did not believe the archaeological evidence supported the Walam Olum's migration account. Although Griffin remained skeptical of Black's suggestion that there were similarities between the historic Delaware tribe and prehistoric mound builders of the Ohio, Griffin respected the evidence that Black presented to show the connections between the groups.

The team's investigations of the Walum Olum were rejected by other professionals at the time. Historians now consider the Walum Olum to be a hoax and believe that Constantine Samuel Rafinesque created the materials to support his assertion that North America's natives had European origins. Because of the controversies and criticisms surrounding the research team's conclusions, Black ended all subsequent investigations on the Walum Olum, but he continued with other ethnological research. In 1936, Black began excavation of documented villages that were believed to have been inhabited by the Miami, Shawnee, and Potawatomi people during the seventeenth and eighteenth centuries before he turned most of his attention to Angel Mounds.

=== Angel Mounds excavation ===
Black first encountered Angel Mounds, a Mississippian (A.D. 1050–1450) community near present-day Evansville, Indiana, in 1931, when it was one of the sites that he visited during a tour of Indiana's archeological sites. The Indiana Historical Society bought the Angel site in 1938 with funding from Eli Lilly. The archaeological site, which was in danger of being incorporated into the City of Evansville, was acquired to protect and preserve it for future research and education. Black thought that Angel Mounds would provide an opportunity to conduct a long-term study of a single archaeological site. By 1939, Glenn and Ida Black had moved into a house on the property. From 1939 to 1964, Black devoted more than two decades of study at the Angel site, beginning with a large crew of Works Projects Administration workers prior to World War II. Students participating in field course work continued excavation during the summer months after the war. Excavation was still underway when Black died unexpectedly in 1964.

Black was responsible for the identification of Native American archaeological sites in Indiana, but his primary effort was at Angel Mounds, which he brought to national attention. From 1939 to 1942, as part of President Franklin D. Roosevelt's New Deal, WPA worker excavated the site under Black's direction, employing more than 250 people and excavating 120,000 square feet (11,000 m^{2}) of the site. The effort resulted in the recording and processing of 2.3 million archaeological items. Black also operated a field training for student archaeologists at Angel Mounds from 1945 through the summer of 1962, although World War II temporarily halted excavation from 1941 to 1945. Further research and excavation at the site resumed in 1945 as part of the Indiana University Archaeology Field School.

Control of Angel Mounds is transferred to the state of Indiana in 1946. but the Indiana Historical Society retained rights to excavate the site and Black remained on the property as its caretaker. Between 1958 and 1962, two National Science Foundation grants provided financial support to Black's efforts to apply geophysical applications to archaeological sites. Black and his student assistants tested a proton magnetometer's potential use in locating subsurface features at archaeological sites, extending the work begun by the University of Oxford's Research Laboratory for Archaeology and the History of Art. Black and his students traced segments of the palisade walls at Angel Mounds that were not visible from the surface. This project made Black among the first prehistorians to make "comprehensive tests in the Americas" to assess the proton magnetometer's potential on a New World site. Angel Mounds was designated a National Historic Landmark in 1964. In addition, his innovative excavation techniques were partially adopted by the University of Chicago Field School, one of the few training programs in archaeological field techniques in the United States in the first half of the 20th century.

=== Affiliation with Indiana University ===
In 1944, Black was appointed a lecturer in archaeology at Indiana University's Department of Zoology (where the school's archaeology studies first resided). He became a founding member of IU's Department of Anthropology in 1947, and remained a part-time lecturer in the department until he retired from teaching in 1960. Black maintained his residence near Angel Mounds and commuted each week from Evansville to Bloomington, Indiana, to teach. Black trained hundreds of students through his courses in Bloomington and 120 more students as the director of the field school at Angel Mounds during the summer months.

== Other interests ==
In 1934, Black became a founding member of the Society for American Archaeology and served as the organization's vice president (1939–1940), council member (1940–1941), president (1941–1942), and treasurer (1947–1951). He also became a member of the Indiana Academy of Science in 1932 and served as chairman of its archaeology division (1936 –1938). In addition, he served on the National Research Council (1957–1960).

== Later years ==
Black was awarded an honorary Doctor of Science degree from Wabash College in 1951, and retired from lecturing at IU in 1960. Black was seen as the only professional archaeologist practicing in Indiana until the 1960s. From 1963 to 1964, Black and the site team completed excavation of the large mound, at the Angel site. He spent his final years working on the manuscript for a book about his work at Angel Mounds.

== Death and legacy ==
Black died on September 2, 1964, at Deaconess Hospital in Evansville, Indiana, after suffering a heart attack while excavating at Angel Mounds.

According to James H. Kellar, Black was "the first professional archaeologist continuously involved in the study of Indiana's prehistoric past." Black, the only archaeologist in Indiana for most of his professional life, "redefined archaeological field methodology, and brought systematic excavations and innovative technology to the field." His work at Nowlin Mound and the subsequent report published in the Indiana History Bulletin in July 1936 are considered "landmarks in the history of American field archaeology."

Black is best known for the excavation of Angel Mounds near Evansville, Indiana, that took place between 1938 and 1964, as well as his posthumously published book, Angel Site: An Archaeological, Historical and Ethnological Study (1967). Black died before his manuscript was published; however, James Kellar completed the two-volume work using Black's unfinished manuscripts and research notes. The book includes Black's descriptions of the site's archaeological features and artifacts, as well as descriptions of its history and setting.

Angel Mounds, the primary subject of Black's investigations, was designated a National Historic Landmark in 1964. The Indiana Historical Society transferred its excavation rights at Angel Mounds to Indiana University in 1965; the Indiana State Museum and Historic Sites is the present-day manager of the site.

The Glenn A. Black Laboratory of Archaeology on the Indiana University campus in Bloomington, Indiana, was established in 1965, when the Lilly Endowment (through funding from Eli Lilly) made a gift of US$300,000 to construct a building to house, exhibit, and research prehistory and Indiana archaeology. The present-day facility was named in Black's honor and dedicated April 21, 1971. The building was initially intended to house Lilly's archaeological collation, as well as Black's materials on Angel Mounds. The laboratory, its collections, library, and museum continue to encourage academic research, as well as preservating and exhibiting Indiana's archaeological history.

== Selected published works ==
- "A" is for axe ––: A "first reader" about some Indian artifacts. Indianapolis: Indiana Historical Society. 1958. OCLC 13288440.
- Angel Mounds Report. Indianapolis: Indiana Historical Society Press. 1964. OCLC 15337124.
- (with James H. Kellar) (1967). Angel Site, An Archaeological, Historical and Ethnological Study. Indianapolis: Indiana Historical Society. OCLC 162754. 2 volumes.
- Angel Site, Vanderburgh County, Indiana: An Introduction. Prehistory Research Series. Vol. 2. Indianapolis: Indiana Historical Society. December 1944. pp. 451–521. OCLC 20104588.
- "An Archaeological Consideration of the Walam Olum" in Walam Olum or Red Score: The Migration Legend of the Lenni Lenape or Delaware Indians: A New Translation, Interpreted by Linguistic, Historical, Archaeological, and Physical Anthropological Studies. Indianapolis: Indiana Historical Society. 1954. pp. 292–348. OCLC 1633009.
- "Archaeological Survey of Dearborn and Ohio Counties, Indiana". Indiana History Bulletin. 11 (7). Indianapolis: Indiana Historical Bureau: 173–260. April 1934. OCLC 15112627.
- "Archaeology of the Angel Mounds Site". Indiana Academy of Science Proceedings. 50. Indianapolis: 25–26. 1940.
- "The Archaeology of Greene County, Indiana". Indiana History Bulletin. 10 (5). Indianapolis. 1933.
- "The Cato Site––Pike County, Indiana". Indiana Academy of Science Proceedings. 55. Indianapolis: 18–22. 1945.
- Down Through the Years: A History of Newburgh Lodge No. 174, F. & A.M., Newburgh, Indiana: First Meeting Under Dispensation, June 6, 1854. Franklin, Indiana: Indiana Freemason. 1955. OCLC 18422429.
- "Excavation of the Nowlin Mound: Dearborn County Site 7, 1934-1935". Indiana History Bulletin. 13 (7). Indianapolis: Indiana Historical Bureau: 201–342. July 1936.
- "An Indiana Archaeological Field School". Indiana Academy of Science Proceedings. 58. Indianapolis: 47. 1948.
- The Location of Fort Knox, Knox County, Indiana: A Report Prepared for Mr. John Biel, Chairman, Harrison Trail Commission. Bloomington, Indiana. 1959. OCLC 16973777.
- (with Paul Weer) (1936). "Outlines Suggesting Classification Problems". Indiana Academy of Science Proceedings. 45. Indianapolis: 37–47.
- (with Paul Weer) (1936). "A Proposed Terminology for Shape Classification of Artifacts". American Antiquity. 1 (4): 280–94. doi:10.2307/275243. JSTOR 275243. S2CID 160944980.
- (with Richard B. Johnston) (October 1962). "A Test of Magnetometry as an Aid to Archaeology". American Antiquity. 28 (2): 199–205. doi:10.2307/278378. JSTOR 278378. S2CID 162365551.
- "Trait Complexes at the Angel Site". Proceedings of the Indiana Academy of Science. 51: 34–43. 1942.
- (with Richard B. Johnston) (1962). Two Graves in Warrick County, Indiana, near Angel Site. Prehistory Research Series. Vol. 4. Indianapolis: Indiana Historical Society. pp. 1–37. OCLC 2683303.

== Honors and awards ==
- 1951, awarded an honorary Doctor of Science degree from Wabash College
- 2018, the Indiana Historical Bureau, the Indiana State Museum and Historic Sites, the Glenn A. Black Laboratory of Archaeology, the Indiana Historical Society, and Friends of Angel Mounds and Cultural Resources Analysts honored Black and his archaeological contributions with a state historical marker erected at his former home on the Angel Mounds property in Evansville, Indiana.
