= Weixi Lisu Autonomous County =

- Autonomous county

Name transcription(s)
  - Chinese: 维西傈僳族自治县
  - Tibetan: འབའ་ལུང་ལི་སུའུ་རིགས་རང་སྐྱོང་རྫོང།
  - Lisu: ꓪꓰꓲ-ꓫꓲꓸ ꓡꓲ-ꓢꓴ ꓫꓵꓽ ꓝꓲꓸ ꓛꓬꓽ ꓫꓯꓽ
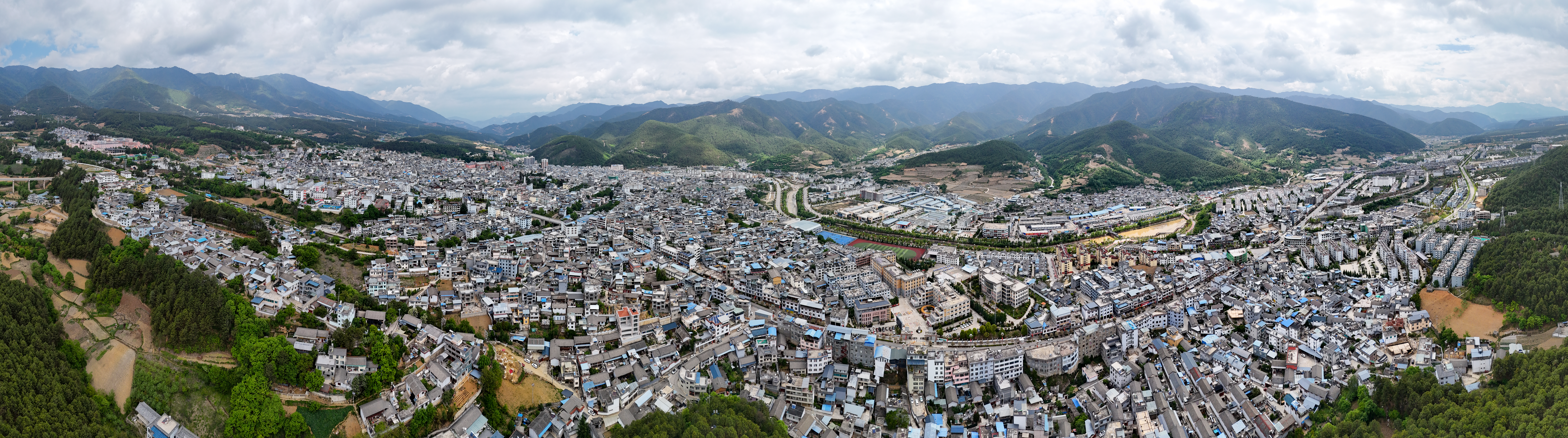
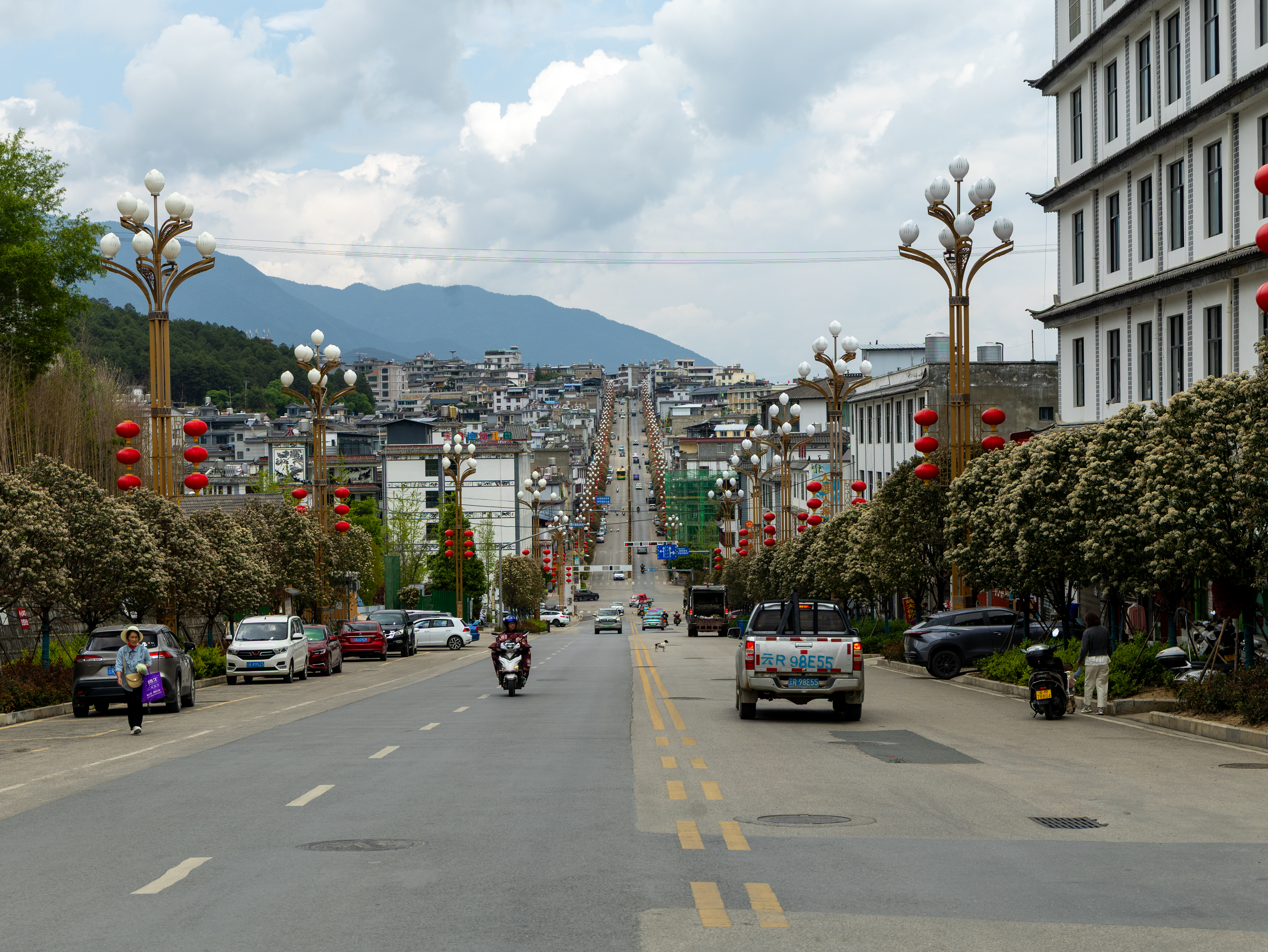
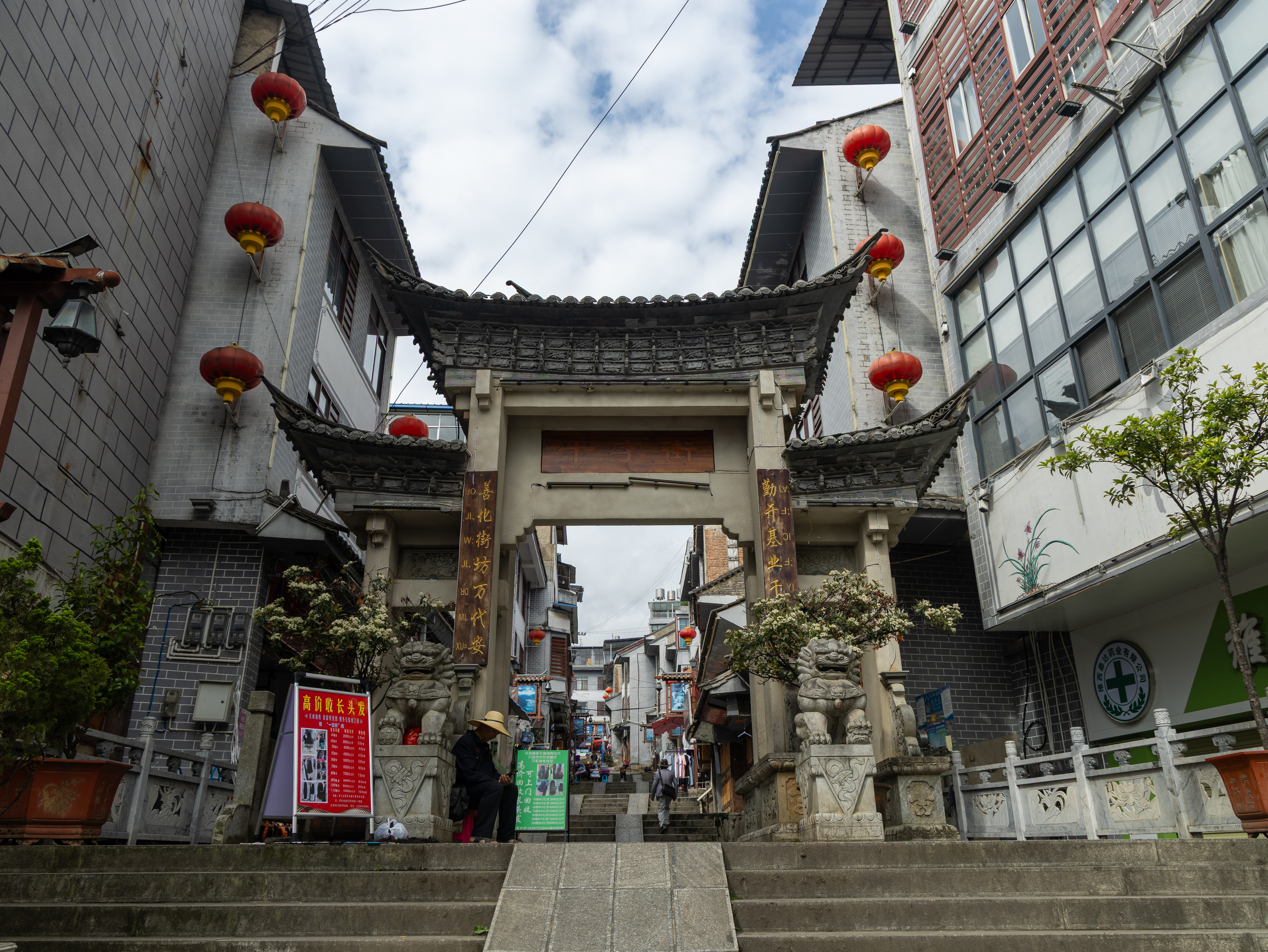
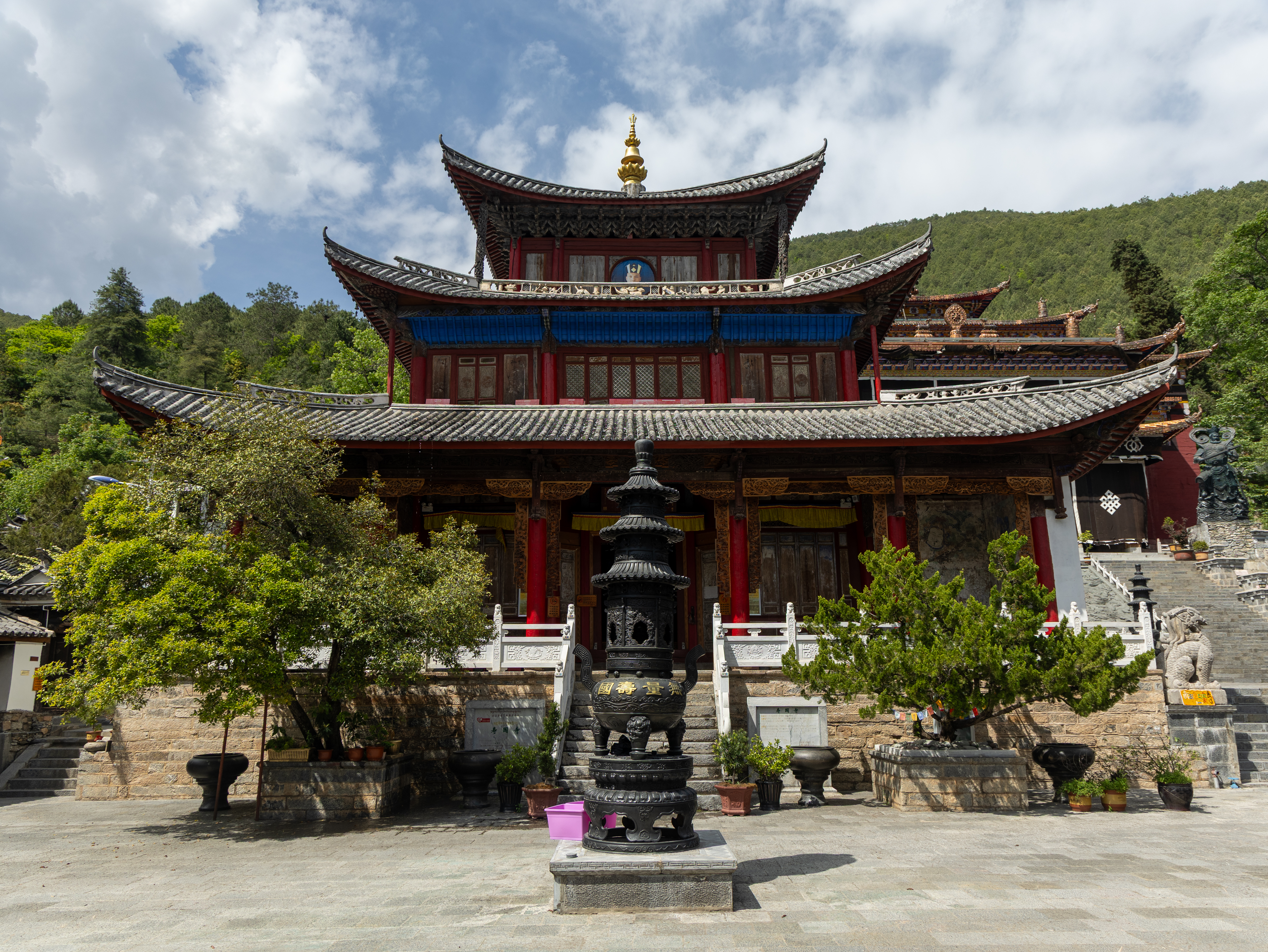
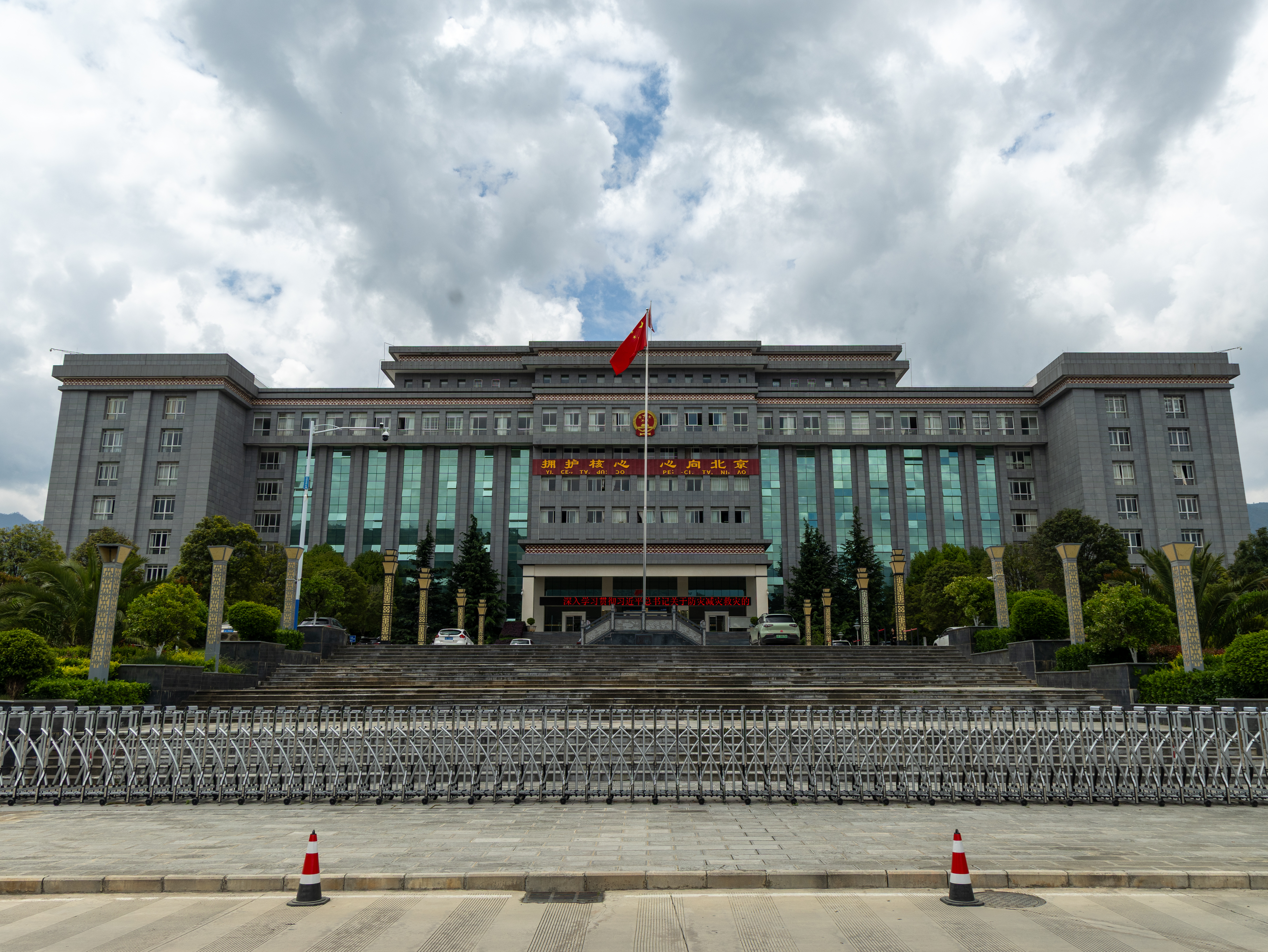
- Skyline of county town New town Old town Shouguo Temple Government hall

- Location of Weixi County (red) in Diqing Prefecture (pink) within Yunnan
- Coordinates: 27°12′58″N 99°15′58″E
- Country: China
- Province: Yunnan
- Autonomous prefecture: Diqing
- County seat: Baohe

Area
  - Total: 4,661 km^{2} (1,800 sq mi)

Population (2020 census)
  - Total: 146,363
  - Density: 31.40/km^{2} (81.33/sq mi)
- Time zone: UTC+8 (CST)
- Postal code: 674600
- Area code: 0887
- Website: weixi.diqing.gov.cn

Weixi Lisu Autonomous County

Chinese name
- Simplified Chinese: 维西傈僳族自治县
- Traditional Chinese: 維西傈僳族自治縣
Transcriptions
Standard Mandarin
- Hanyu Pinyin: Wéixī Lìsùzú Zìzhìxiàn

Tibetan name
- Tibetan: འབའ་ལུང་ལི་སུའུ་རིགས་རང་སྐྱོང་རྫོང།
Transcriptions
- Wylie: 'ba'-lung li-su'u-rigs rang-skyong rdzong
- Tibetan Pinyin: Balung Lisurig Ranggyong Zong

Lisu name
- Lisu: ꓪꓰꓲ-ꓫꓲꓸ ꓡꓲ-ꓢꓴ ꓫꓵꓽ ꓝꓲꓸ ꓛꓬꓽ ꓫꓯꓽ

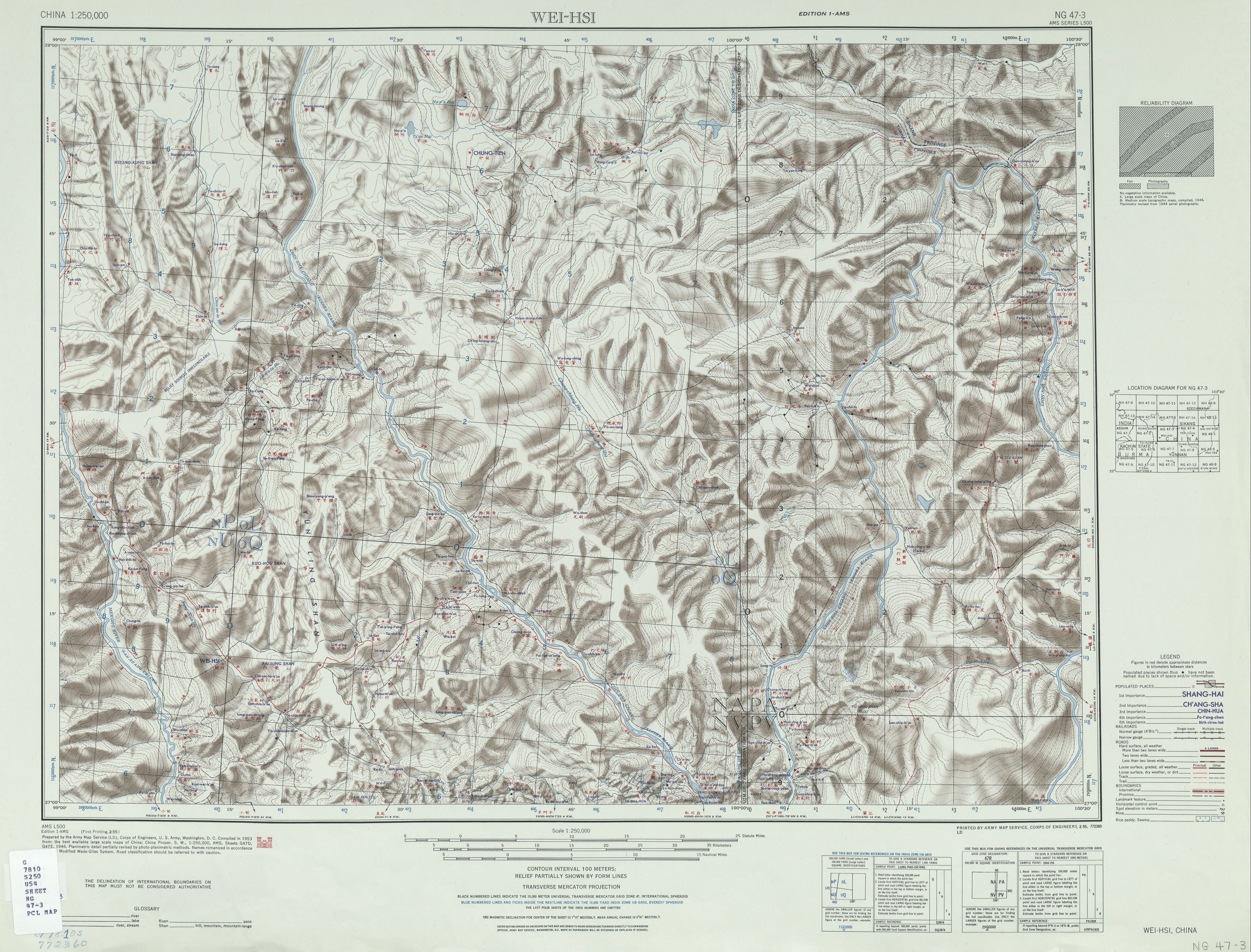
Weixi (labelled as WEI-HSI 維西) (1953)

Weixi Lisu Autonomous County (Note: Chinese: 维西傈僳族自治县; pinyin: Wéixī Lìsùzú Zìzhìxiàn; Tibetan: འབའ་ལུང་ལི་སུའུ་རིགས་རང་སྐྱོང་རྫོང།, ZWPY: Balung Lisurig Ranggyong Zong; Lisu: ꓪꓰꓲ-ꓫꓲꓸ ꓡꓲ-ꓢꓴ ꓫꓵꓽ ꓝꓲꓸ ꓛꓬꓽ ꓫꓯꓽ) is an autonomous county of Diqing Tibetan Autonomous Prefecture, in northwest Yunnan province, China. The titular ethnic group is the Lisu people.

== Geography ==
Weixi Lisu Autonomous County borders Shangri-La City across the river to the east, Yulong County to the southeast, Lanping County to the south, Gongshan County and Fugong County to the west and Deqin County to the north. It is located in the northwest of Yunnan and is the only Lisu Autonomous County in China.

== Administrative divisions ==
Weixi Lisu Autonomous County has 3 towns and 7 townships.

=== Towns ===
- Baohe (保和镇)
- Tacheng (塔城镇)

=== Townships ===
- Yongchun (永春乡)
- Pantiange (攀天阁乡)
- Baijixun (白济汛乡)
- Kangpu (康普乡)
- Zhonglu (中路乡)
- Weideng (维登乡)

== Climate ==
Climate data for Weixi, elevation 2,326 m (7,631 ft), (1991–2020 normals, extremes 1981–present)
| Month | Jan | Feb | Mar | Apr | May | Jun | Jul | Aug | Sep | Oct | Nov | Dec | Year |
|---|---|---|---|---|---|---|---|---|---|---|---|---|---|
| Record high °C (°F) | 23.0 (73.4) | 23.2 (73.8) | 26.2 (79.2) | 28.0 (82.4) | 31.1 (88.0) | 31.9 (89.4) | 31.8 (89.2) | 31.1 (88.0) | 30.5 (86.9) | 27.2 (81.0) | 27.8 (82.0) | 21.3 (70.3) | 31.9 (89.4) |
| Mean daily maximum °C (°F) | 12.7 (54.9) | 13.7 (56.7) | 15.6 (60.1) | 18.5 (65.3) | 22.1 (71.8) | 25.0 (77.0) | 24.9 (76.8) | 24.7 (76.5) | 23.2 (73.8) | 20.3 (68.5) | 17.1 (62.8) | 14.4 (57.9) | 19.3 (66.8) |
| Daily mean °C (°F) | 4.2 (39.6) | 5.8 (42.4) | 8.2 (46.8) | 11.4 (52.5) | 15.3 (59.5) | 18.7 (65.7) | 18.9 (66.0) | 18.4 (65.1) | 16.9 (62.4) | 12.8 (55.0) | 8.1 (46.6) | 5.0 (41.0) | 12.0 (53.6) |
| Mean daily minimum °C (°F) | −1.6 (29.1) | 0.3 (32.5) | 3.0 (37.4) | 6.4 (43.5) | 10.3 (50.5) | 14.3 (57.7) | 15.3 (59.5) | 14.8 (58.6) | 13.4 (56.1) | 8.3 (46.9) | 2.2 (36.0) | −1.3 (29.7) | 7.1 (44.8) |
| Record low °C (°F) | −8.0 (17.6) | −6.8 (19.8) | −2.8 (27.0) | −0.1 (31.8) | 4.3 (39.7) | 8.4 (47.1) | 9.5 (49.1) | 9.3 (48.7) | 2.7 (36.9) | −0.3 (31.5) | −3.3 (26.1) | −8.9 (16.0) | −8.9 (16.0) |
| Average precipitation mm (inches) | 30.5 (1.20) | 59.2 (2.33) | 105.1 (4.14) | 76.3 (3.00) | 66.6 (2.62) | 73.9 (2.91) | 180.5 (7.11) | 168.4 (6.63) | 97.6 (3.84) | 52.9 (2.08) | 17.4 (0.69) | 8.2 (0.32) | 936.6 (36.87) |
| Average precipitation days (≥ 0.1 mm) | 5.8 | 7.6 | 13.6 | 15.0 | 13.5 | 15.0 | 22.0 | 21.9 | 17.4 | 11.0 | 3.9 | 1.9 | 148.6 |
| Average snowy days | 4.0 | 3.5 | 1.6 | 0.1 | 0 | 0 | 0 | 0 | 0 | 0 | 0.2 | 0.9 | 10.3 |
| Average relative humidity (%) | 57 | 62 | 67 | 69 | 69 | 71 | 79 | 80 | 79 | 75 | 65 | 55 | 69 |
| Mean monthly sunshine hours | 212.0 | 181.4 | 173.3 | 160.3 | 159.5 | 138.7 | 122.6 | 125.2 | 115.9 | 167.0 | 212.5 | 229.7 | 1,998.1 |
| Percentage possible sunshine | 64 | 57 | 46 | 42 | 38 | 34 | 29 | 31 | 32 | 47 | 66 | 71 | 46 |
Source: China Meteorological Administrationall-time Jul highall-time Nov high
