= George Copway =

Mississaugas Ojibwa writer, ethnographer, missionary, lecturer and advocate

- Kah-Ge-Ga-Gah-Bowh (Gaagigegaabaw)
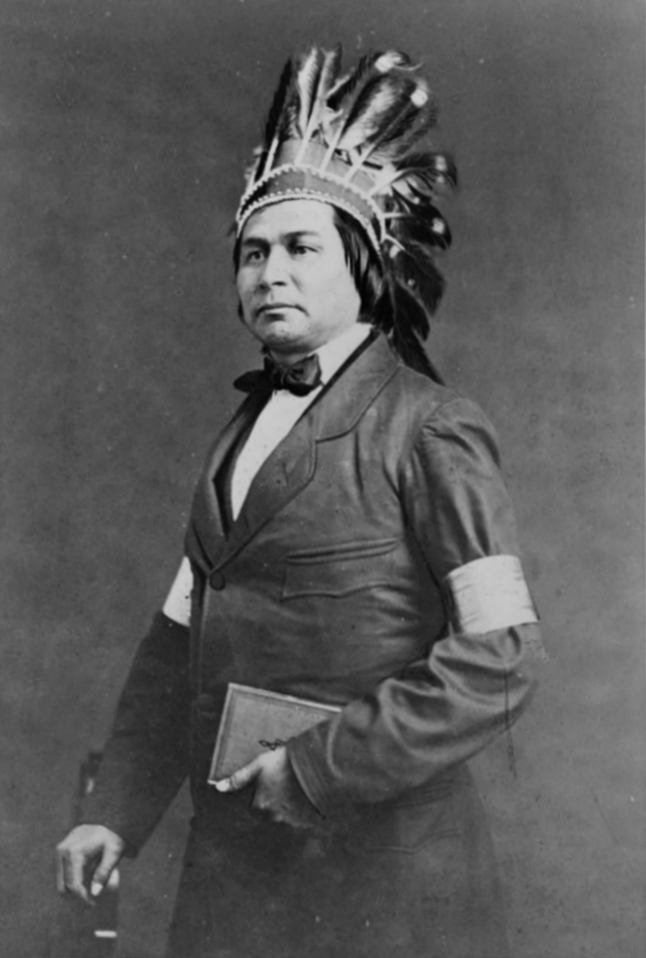
- George Copway ca. 1860
- Born: 1818; Trenton, Ontario
- Died: June 27, 1869 (aged 50–51); Ypsilanti, Michigan
- Occupations: Native American author and historian
- Known for: Publications on Ojibwa culture and history
- Notable work: The Life, History and Travels of Kah-ge-ga-gah-Bowh (1847)

George Copway (Ojibwe: Kah-Ge-Ga-Gah-Bowh; 1818 – June 27, 1869) was a Mississaugas Ojibwa writer, ethnographer, Methodist missionary, lecturer, and advocate of indigenous peoples. His Ojibwa name was Kah-Ge-Ga-Gah-Bowh (Gaagigegaabaw in the Fiero orthography), meaning 'He Who Stands Forever'. In 1847 he published a memoir about his life and time as a missionary. This work made him Canada's first literary celebrity in the United States. In 1851 he published The Traditional History and Characteristic Sketches of The Ojibway Nation, the first published history of the Ojibwa in English.

== Biography ==
Copway was born near Trenton, Ontario, into a Mississauga Anishinaabe family; his father John Copway was a Mississauga chief and medicine man. His parents converted to Methodism in 1827. Beginning in the 1830s, the young Copway attended the local mission school.

In July 1834, together with an uncle and cousin, he was invited to work with a Methodist minister as a missionary to Ojibwe who lived near the western part of Lake Superior. His activities in two different areas over the next few years included working with Reverend Sherman Hall in La Pointe, Wisconsin to translate the Christian Acts of the Apostles and the Gospel of St Luke into Ojibwa. In 1838 the Methodists provided for Copway's education in Illinois, and later ordained him as a minister.

In 1840, Copway met Elizabeth Howell, an English woman whose family were farmers in the Toronto area. They married and moved to Minnesota to serve as missionaries. They had a son, George Albert Copway (1843 – 1873) and a daughter Frances Minne-Ha-Ha (Copway) Passmore (1863–1921) during their marriage.

The couple later returned to Canada in 1842, where Copway served as a missionary for the Saugeen and Rice Lake Bands of the Ojibwa. He was elected vice-president of the Ojibwe General Council. In 1846, he was accused and convicted of embezzlement by the Indian Department. Because of this, he was defrocked by the Methodists.

The Copways moved to New York City, where he wrote and published a memoir, The Life, History and Travels of Kah-ge-ga-gah-Bowh (1847), republished in London in 1850 as Recollections of a forest life; or, the life and travels of Kah-ge-ga-gah-bowh. It was the first book published by a Canadian First Nations person. It had six printings in the first year and rapidly became a bestseller.

During the 1840s, he toured and lectured in the United States and also traveled to Europe. That travel provided him with the material for his book of sketches of Europe, Running sketches of men and places, in England, France, Germany, Belgium, and Scotland, published in 1851 after his book on the history of the Ojibwe. During this period, Copway acted as an advocate for a Native American territory, suggesting a 150-square mile territory be established in what was the American Midwest east of the Missouri River. The tribes in the area were under increasing pressure of encroachment by European-American settlers. This proposal was never approved by the United States Congress, but Copway attracted considerable attention from leading intellectuals of the time, including the historian Francis Parkman.

In 1851, Copway started his own weekly newspaper in New York City, titled Copway's American Indian, which ran for approximately three months. He had attracted "letters of support from the eminent ethnologists Lewis Henry Morgan and Henry Rowe Schoolcraft, from Parkman, and from the novelists James Fenimore Cooper and Washington Irving."

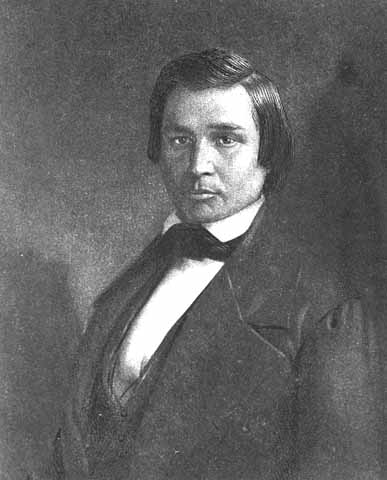
George Copway in 1850

Copway's career subsequently spiralled downward as he began drinking heavily and sank into debt, and in 1858 his wife Elizabeth Howell Copway took his daughter, Frances Minne-Ha-Ha, and left him. Copway traveled throughout New York and Michigan as a herbalist 'street healer' and a Union army recruiter. Copway died in 1869 in Ypsilanti, Michigan.

== Legacy ==
Copway's 1847 memoir and his 1851 history of the Ojibwe The Traditional History and Characteristic Sketches of The Ojibway Nation included many details about their traditional culture. He dedicated a few chapters to the use of birch bark scrolls, the symbolic writing that was used, and the meaning of various symbols. These elaborate scrolls were used to remember songs, history, and ceremonies. The care and reproduction of these scrolls by a select few is described in detail.

A recurring theme in Copway's publications is the use of alcohol by Euromericans to weaken Native American social fabric:

The introduction of spirituous liquors...has been greater than all other evils combined. Intemperance and disease. The fire-water has done its work of disaster. By it the glad shouts of the youth of our land have died away in wails of grief! Fathers have followed their children to their graves. Children have sent their wail of woe, echoing from vale to vale. And around the cheering fires of the Indian, the white man has received the gain of avarice. Peace and Happiness entwined around the fire-side of the Indian once. Union, harmony, and a common brotherhood cemented them all. But as soon as these vile drinks were introduced, dissipation commenced, and the ruin and downfall of a noble race has gone on — every year lessening their numbers.

In 2018, Copway was designated a National Historic Person by the Canadian federal government (through the Minister of Environment & Climate Change).

== Selected bibliography ==
- The Life, History and Travels of Kah-ge-ga-gah-Bowh (1847), available online at Internet Archive
- The Traditional History and Characteristic Sketches of the Ojibway Nation (1850), available online at Internet Archive
- The Life, Letters, and Speeches of Kah-ge-ga-gah-Bowh, or G. Copway, a chief of the Ojibwa Nation (1850), available online at Internet Archive
- Ojibwa Conquest (1850), available online at Internet Archive
- Organization of a New Indian Territory, East of the Missouri River (1850), available online at Internet Archive
- Running Sketches of Men and Places, in England, France, Germany, Belgium, and Scotland (1851), available online at Internet Archive
- Indian Life and Indian History (1860), available online at Internet Archive
