= Charles F. Voegelin =

American linguist (1906–1986)

- Voegelin with his second wife, Florence, at a Navajo craft show in 1966
- Born: January 14, 1906; New York City, United States
- Died: May 22, 1986 (aged 80); Bloomington, Indiana
- Other name: Carl
- Known for: Work on indigenous languages
- Spouse: Erminie Wheeler-Voegelin (divorced) Florence M. Voegelin (m. 1954)

Academic background
- Education: Stanford University (BA); University of California, Berkeley (PhD)
- Academic advisors: Alfred Kroeber; Robert Lowie; Melville Jacobs

Academic work
- Discipline: Linguist, anthropologist
- Sub-discipline: Native American linguistics
- Institutions: Indiana University Bloomington
- Notable students: Ken Hale; Dell Hymes

Charles Frederick "Carl" Voegelin (January 14, 1906 – May 22, 1986), often cited as C. F. Voegelin, was an American linguist and anthropologist. He was one of the leading authorities on Indigenous languages of North America, specifically the Algonquian and Uto-Aztecan languages. He published works on the Delaware, Shawnee, Hopi and Tübatulabal languages.

== Early life and education ==
Voegelin was born in New York City on January 14, 1906, and christened Charles Frederick Voegelin, but he became known as Carl.

He entered Stanford University and earned a BA in Psychology, after which he traveled to New Zealand to study Maori music. Then he decided to study anthropology at University of California, Berkeley where he was trained by Alfred Kroeber, Robert Lowie and Melville Jacobs, writing his dissertation as a grammar of Tübatulabal. At first he had great difficulties hearing the phonetic distinctions of the language, but in 1931 he went to the field with Danish linguist Hans Jørgen Uldall who taught him to recognize all the phonetic contrasts. His proficiency in Indigenous languages became so good that he was able to correspond with Leonard Bloomfield in Ojibwe, letters later published in the journal Anthropological Linguistics.

== Career ==
Voegelin went on to do postdoctoral work in linguistics at Yale University with Edward Sapir, and then he taught at DePauw University, before joining Indiana University Bloomington in 1941 as that university's first professor of anthropology. During his tenure at Indiana he managed the United States' largest Army Specialized Training Program in foreign languages. In 1944, he persuaded Indiana University to host the International Journal of American Linguistics (IJAL), which had stopped being published in 1939, shortly before the death of its first editor Franz Boas. Voegelin served as editor of IJAL for many years.

Among his graduate students at Indiana were Ken Hale and Dell Hymes. Later he held an appointment at the University of Hawaiʻi, before returning to Indiana as an emeritus professor.

== Personal life ==
Voegelin was first married to ethnologist Erminie Wheeler-Voegelin, with whom he conducted fieldwork. Later he married linguist Florence M. Voegelin, an accomplished linguist in her own right. Together they co-authored numerous publications.

He died on May 22, 1986.

== Honors ==
In 1947, Voegelin was Guggenheim Fellow at Indiana University Bloomington's Department of Anthropology. He became a fellow of the American Academy of Arts and Sciences in 1951. He was president of the Linguistic Society of America in 1954.

In 1975, several of Voegelin's colleagues and former students collaborated on a Festschrift entitled Linguistics and Anthropology: In Honor of C. F. Voegelin. In 1983 he was awarded an Honorary Doctorate (Doctor of Humane Letters) by Indiana University Bloomington, as well as a Distinguished Service Award of the American Anthropological Association. Voegelin's collected papers are held by the American Philosophical Society.

== Selected publications ==
- "Tübatulabal Grammar". University of California Publications in American Archaeology and Ethnology. 34: 55–190. 1935.
- "Tubatulabal Texts". University of California Publications in American Archaeology and Ethnology. 34: 191–246. 1935.
- "Working Dictionary of Tübatulabal". International Journal of American Linguistics. 24 (3): 221–228. 1958. doi:10.1086/464459. S2CID 145758965.
- Map of North American Indian Languages. American Ethnological Society. 1941. With Florence M. Voegelin.
- Shawnee Phonemes. Language 11: pages 23–37. 1935.
- Productive Paradigms in Shawnee. 1936., in: Lowie, Robert Harry, ed. (1936), Essays in anthropology : presented to A. L. Kroeber in celebration of his sixtieth birthday, June 11, 1936, University of California Press
- Shawnee Stems and the Jacob P. Dunn Miami Dictionary. Indiana Historical Society Prehistory Research Series 1: pages 63–108, 135-167, 289-323, 345-406, 409-478, 1938–1940.
- Hopi domains: A lexical approach to the problem of selection. Indiana University Publications in Anthropology and Linguistics: Memoir 14. With Florence M. Voegelin. 1957.
- 1959. Guide to transcribing unwritten languages in field work. Anthropological Linguistics 1: pages 1–28. With Florence M. Voegelin. 1962.
- Typological and Comparative Grammar of Uto-Aztecan; I, Phonology. IJAL Memoir no. 17. With Florence M. Voegelin and Ken Hale. 1962.
- Typological and comparative grammar of Uto-Aztecan. IJAL 28(1):210-213. With Florence M. Voegelin.
- O'Grady, Geoffrey N.; Voegelin, Carl F.; Voegelin, Florence M. (1966). "Languages of the world : Indo-Pacific Fascicle Six". Anthropological Linguistics. 8 (2): 1–197.
- Passive transformations form non-transitive bases in Hopi. IJAL 33: pages 276-281. With Florence M. Voegelin. 1967.
- Classification and index of the world's languages. (Foundations of Linguistics series). New York: Elsevier. With Florence M. Voegelin. 1977.
