= Erminie Wheeler-Voegelin =

American anthropologist, folklorist and ethnohistorian (1903-1988)

- Born: April 2, 1903
- Died: July 10, 1988 (aged 85)
- Spouse: Charles F. Voegelin

Academic background
- Education: University of California, Berkeley (BA, MA); Yale University (PhD)

Academic work
- Discipline: Anthropologist, folklorist, ethnohistorian

Erminie Wheeler-Voegelin (April 2, 1903 – July 10, 1988) was an American award-winning anthropologist, folklorist, and ethnohistorian.

Her research and directorship of the Great Lakes-Ohio Valley Research Project at Indiana University has been used to backup Native Americans during court cases with the US government over treaty claims.

== Early life and education ==
Erminie was the daughter of Ermine Brooke Wheeler and Roscoe Wheeler, a mining engineer. She went to Technical High School in Oakland, California.

She graduated from the University of California, Berkeley, in 1923. After graduating, Erminie married and lived in New Orleans. She later moved to St. Petersburg, Florida, after her first marriage dissolved, to write for a local newspaper before returning to Berkeley and pursuing a master's degree in anthropology (1930). Her master's thesis was entitled "Mythological Elements common to the Kowa and Five Other Plains Tribes". While studying under Alfred Kroeber in the Department of Anthropology at the University of California, Erminie met and later married her second husband, Carl Voegelin. They lived and worked together for the next two decades.

== Career ==
Her second marriage was to linguistic anthropologist Charles F. Voegelin, with whom she jointly conducted fieldwork among Native American peoples.

In 1933 Eli Lilly, president of the prominent pharmaceutical company in Indiana, created a graduate fellowship at Yale University, to honor Native American history in southern Indiana. Charles Voegelin was the first recipient for the fellowship but it was then given to Erminie. Fieldwork among the Tübatulabal people of northern California undertaken in 1933 led to her first book, Tübatulabal Ethnography, published by the University of California Press in 1941. She holds the distinction of being the first woman to receive a doctoral degree in anthropology from Yale University when she received her degree in 1939 with a dissertation entitled "Shawnee Mortuary Customs," published five years later by the Indiana Historical Society.

In the 1940s, Wheeler-Voegelin worked in the upper Great Lakes conducting linguistic and ethnographic fieldwork among the Ottawas and Ojibwe living in the Upper Peninsula of Michigan. A specialist in Native American folklore, she founded the American Society for Ethnohistory in 1954 and was its first editor of the journal Ethnohistory until 1964. She was also the first person to teach a course in Ethnohistory at an American University.

Wheeler-Voegelin taught in anthropology, history, and folklore at Indiana University, Bloomington, beginning in the fall of 1943. She received a Guggenheim Fellowship in 1947 to pursue comparative studies of the folklore and mythology of American Indians and Eskimos. In 1948, she became president of the American Folklore Society, and from 1949 to 1951, she served as secretary for the American Anthropological Association. She edited the Journal of American Folklore from 1941 to 1946 and won the American Folklore Society's Chicago Book Prize in 1950. She was one of the original inductees into the Fellows of the American Folklore Society in 1960.

== Great Lakes-Ohio Valley Research Project ==
At Indiana University, Wheeler-Voegelin also directed the Great Lakes-Ohio Valley Research Project from 1956 to 1969, the date of her retirement. The project was funded by the US Department of Justice and carried out research "to determine the locations and migrations of the indigenous inhabitants of the Great Lakes and Ohio Valley region during the period that Europeans first moved into the area".

Wheeler-Voegelin supervised a team of three to five researchers who examined special collections in libraries across North America and Europe, collecting materials which concerned "any mention of American Indian land use and occupancy for the Great Lakes-Ohio Valley region".

The information was used in cases taken before the Indian Claims Commission. The research reports on tribes of the region are now housed at the IU Museum of Archaeology and Anthropology (formerly the Glenn A. Black Laboratory of Archaeology, Erminie Wheeler Voegelin Archive) as the Great Lakes-Ohio Valley Ethnohistory (GLOVE) collection at Indiana University Bloomington.

== Later life ==
Upon retirement, Wheeler-Voegelin moved to Great Falls, Virginia, to live with her daughter and son-in-law. In the fall of 1985 she gave her Shawnee field notes and remaining professional books and papers to the Newberry Library in Chicago.

Wheeler-Voegelin died of cardiac arrest on July 10, 1988.

== Legacy ==
In 1982, the American Society for Ethnohistory created its Erminie Wheeler-Voegelin Prize for best book-length work in the field of ethnohistory.

== Selected publications ==
- Kinietz, W. Vernon, Wheeler-Voegelin, Erminie (1939). Shawnese traditions: C.C. Trowbridge's account,. Ann Arbor [Mich.: University of Michigan Press. OCLC 629653.
- Voegelin, Charles Frederick; Voegelin, Erminie Wheeler (1944). Map of North American Indian languages. New York. OCLC 46286475.
- Voegelin, Erminie W. (1933) "Kowa-Crow Mythological Affiliations" American Anthropologist 35(3): 470.
- Voegelin, Erminie Wheeler (1938). Tubatulabal Ethnography, 1938. Berkeley: University of California Press. OCLC 458633456.
- Warren, Stephen (April 2018). "Salvaging the Salvage Anthropologists: Erminie Wheeler-Voegelin, Carl Voegelin, and the Future of Ethnohistory," Ethnohistory 65(2): 189–214. DOI 10.1215/00141801-4383689
- Wheeler-Voegelin, Erminie (1942). Northeast California. Berkeley; Los Angeles: University of California Press. OCLC 254402106.
- Wheeler-Voegelin, Erminie (1944). Mortuary customs of the Shawnee and other Eastern tribes. Indianapolis: Indiana Historical Society. OCLC 2519714.
