= Florence M. Voegelin =

American linguist (1927–1989)

- Voegelin in 1966
- Born: Florence Marie Harmon; 1927
- Died: January 9, 1989 (aged 61)
- Organizations: Anthropological Linguistics
- Spouses: Ralph Robinett (div. 1952) Charles Voegelin (m. 1954; death 1986)

Academic background
- Education: Indiana University Bloomington
- Doctoral advisor: Charles Voegelin

Florence Marie "Flo" Voegelin (née Harmon; 1927 – January 9, 1989), also known as Florence Marie Robinett and Florence Marie Robinett Voegelin, was an American anthropologist and linguist. She was a prominent figure in the documentation of the indigenous languages of North America, and co-wrote many articles and books with her second husband, Carl Voegelin. She also published under the name F. M. Voegelin and other variants.

== Early life and education ==
Florence Voegelin grew up in Colorado. She received a bachelor's degree from the Colorado Teachers College (currently the University of Northern Colorado). After graduation, she taught English in Puerto Rico. She earned her doctorate from Indiana University Bloomington in 1954. To support herself while she was in school, Voegelin taught Lithuanian with the Air Force Language Training Program. She continued to travel and do descriptive fieldwork on languages of the Americas for the rest of her life.

She married and divorced Ralph Robinett by 1952. Her second husband was Carl Voegelin, a prominent linguist and anthropologist who was her graduate advisor at Indiana University Bloomington. They married in 1954, and they remained married until his death in 1986.

== Career ==
She worked at various points as a research associate at the Museum of Northern Arizona and also as a member of the Indiana University Field Station.

She was the head of the Languages of the World Archives at the Indiana University Bloomington, and a visiting professor at the University of Hawaiʻi at Mānoa. She also was the founder of the journal Anthropological Linguistics, for which she was the editor from 1959 to 1987. Later in her life Voegelin was the honorary chairperson of the Seventh Annual Conference on Siouan and Caddoan languages in 1987, as well as the President-Elect and Vice President of the Society for the Study of the Indigenous Languages of the Americas.

== Research ==
Voegelin's research centered on indigenous languages of the American Southwest. Her dissertation work was on Hidatsa, a Siouan language spoken in North Dakota and South Dakota. She also worked on Hopi and comparative Uto-Aztecan. She co-authored numerous publications with Carl Voegelin, including work on Shawnee and a series of fascicles on the languages of the world with an eye toward comparative studies, which was also published as an independent volume in 1977. She also had ongoing friendly relationships with Mrs. Seumptewa, a speaker of Hopi, and Margaret Haven, a Hidatsa speaker.

== Names ==
Voegelin was known as Florence Marie Robinett, Florence Marie Robinett Voegelin and also published as F. M. Voegelin and Florence M. Robinett. She was usually called "Flo".

== Awards ==
Voegelin was honored with a dinner at the Arizona State Museum in Tucson and an exhibit entitled Daughters of the Desert: Women Anthropologists in the Southwest, 1880-1980.

== Later life and legacy ==
Voegelin died of cancer on January 9, 1989, at the age of 61.

== Selected publications ==
- Voegelin, C. F.; Robinett, Florence M. (1954). "'Mother Language' in Hidatsa". International Journal of American Linguistics. 20 (1). University of Chicago Press: 65–70. doi:10.1086/464252. ISSN 0020-7071. S2CID 143219683.
- Robinett, Florence M. 1954. First report on the Archives of Languages of the World. International Journal of American Linguistics 20(3): pages 241-247.
- Robinett, Florence M. 1955. Hidatsa I, II, and III. International Journal of American Linguistics 21: pages 1–7, 160–177, 210–216.
- Voegelin, Carl F., and Florence M. Voegelin. 1957. Hopi domains: A lexical approach to the problem of selection. Indiana University Publications in Anthropology and Linguistics: Memoir 14.
- Voegelin, Carl F., and Florence M. Voegelin. 1959. Guide to transcribing unwritten languages in field work. Anthropological Linguistics 1: pages 1–28.
- Voegelin, Carl F., Florence M. Voegelin, and Kenneth Hale. 1962. Typological and Comparative Grammar of Uto-Aztecan; I, Phonology. International Journal of American Linguistics Memoir no. 17.
- Voegelin, Carl F., and Florence M. Voegelin. 1962. Typological and comparative grammar of Uto-Aztecan. International Journal of American Linguistics 28(1): pages 210-213.
- Voegelin, Carl F., and Florence M. Voegelin. 1967. Passive transformations form non-transitive bases in Hopi. International Journal of American Linguistics 33: pages 276-281.
- O'Grady, Geoffrey N.; Voegelin, Carl F.; Voegelin, Florence M. (1966). "Languages of the world : Indo-Pacific Fascicle Six". Anthropological Linguistics. 8 (2): 1–197.
- Voegelin, Carl F., and Florence M. Voegelin. 1977. Classification and index of the world's languages. (Foundations of Linguistics series). New York: Elsevier.
