= Lanping Bai and Pumi Autonomous County =

Lanping County 兰坪县 · Ket•dant xiainb · ꓡꓽ-ꓒꓲꓽ ꓫꓯꓹ
- Autonomous county
- 兰坪白族普米族自治县; Lanping Bai and Pumi Autonomous County

Name transcription(s)
  - Chinese: 兰坪白族普米族自治县
  - Lisu: ꓡꓽ-ꓒꓲꓽ ꓡꓽ-ꓐꓶꓽ ꓫꓵꓽ ꓒꓴ-ꓟꓲ ꓫꓵꓽ ꓚꓲꓸ ꓛꓬꓽ ꓗꓪꓼ ꓫꓵꓽ ꓫꓯꓹ
  - Bai: Ketdant Baifcuf Pupmipcuf zibzibxiand
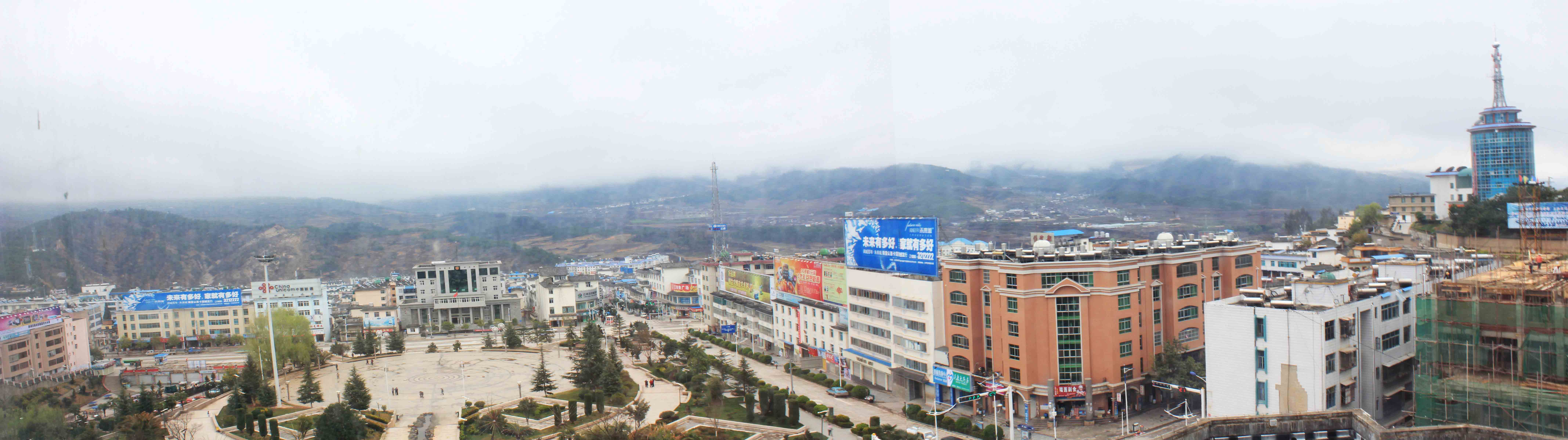
- Jinding, the county seat

- Location of Lanping County (red) and Nujiang Prefecture (pink) within Yunnan province

- Location of the seat in Yunnan
- Coordinates: 26°35′43″N 99°19′12″E
- Country: China
- Province: Yunnan
- Autonomous prefecture: Nujiang
- County seat: Cuiping Subdistrict

Area
  - Total: 4,455 km^{2} (1,720 sq mi)

Population (2020 census)
  - Total: 195,874
  - Density: 43.97/km^{2} (113.9/sq mi)
- Time zone: UTC+8 (CST)
- Postal code: 671400
- Area code: 0886
- Website: www.lanping.gov.cn

Lanping Bai and Pumi Autonomous County (simplified Chinese: 兰坪白族普米族自治县; traditional Chinese: 蘭坪白族普米族自治縣; pinyin: Lánpíng Báizú Pǔmǐzú Zìzhìxiàn; Bai: Ketdant Baifcuf Pupmipcuf zibzibxiand) is located in Nujiang Lisu Autonomous Prefecture, Yunnan province, China.

== Administrative divisions ==
Lanping Bai and Pumi Autonomous County has 1 subdistrict, 3 towns and 4 townships.

1 subdistrict

- Cuiping Subdistrict (翠屏街道)

4 towns

- Jinding (金顶镇)
- Lajing (啦井镇)
- Yingpan (营盘镇)
- Tongdian (通甸镇)

4 townships

- Hexi (河西乡)
- Zhongpai (中排乡)
- Shideng (石登乡)
- Tu'e (兔峨乡)

== Climate ==
Like most of Yunnan, Lanping has a dry-winter subtropical highland climate (Köppen climate classification: Cwb).

Climate data for Lanping, elevation 2,345 m (7,694 ft), (1991–2020 normals, extremes 1981–present)
Month	Jan	Feb	Mar	Apr	May	Jun	Jul	Aug	Sep	Oct	Nov	Dec	Year
Record high °C (°F)	23.0 (73.4)	23.3 (73.9)	27.0 (80.6)	28.4 (83.1)	30.5 (86.9)	30.1 (86.2)	29.5 (85.1)	28.7 (83.7)	28.1 (82.6)	28.2 (82.8)	24.2 (75.6)	22.4 (72.3)	30.5 (86.9)
Mean daily maximum °C (°F)	14.5 (58.1)	15.8 (60.4)	17.9 (64.2)	20.3 (68.5)	22.7 (72.9)	24.2 (75.6)	23.3 (73.9)	23.5 (74.3)	22.4 (72.3)	20.5 (68.9)	17.9 (64.2)	15.6 (60.1)	19.9 (67.8)
Daily mean °C (°F)	3.6 (38.5)	5.6 (42.1)	8.5 (47.3)	11.7 (53.1)	15.2 (59.4)	17.9 (64.2)	18.0 (64.4)	17.6 (63.7)	16.2 (61.2)	12.5 (54.5)	7.5 (45.5)	4.1 (39.4)	11.5 (52.8)
Mean daily minimum °C (°F)	−3.8 (25.2)	−1.8 (28.8)	1.5 (34.7)	5.0 (41.0)	9.1 (48.4)	13.5 (56.3)	14.9 (58.8)	14.4 (57.9)	13.0 (55.4)	7.9 (46.2)	1.1 (34.0)	−3.1 (26.4)	6.0 (42.8)
Record low °C (°F)	−9.7 (14.5)	−8.9 (16.0)	−6.1 (21.0)	−1.3 (29.7)	1.2 (34.2)	6.4 (43.5)	8.1 (46.6)	6.2 (43.2)	3.5 (38.3)	−1.5 (29.3)	−6.1 (21.0)	−9.6 (14.7)	−9.7 (14.5)
Average precipitation mm (inches)	15.6 (0.61)	20.0 (0.79)	40.9 (1.61)	33.0 (1.30)	67.7 (2.67)	119.0 (4.69)	214.9 (8.46)	214.7 (8.45)	137.5 (5.41)	72.3 (2.85)	17.4 (0.69)	5.4 (0.21)	958.4 (37.74)
Average precipitation days (≥ 0.1 mm)	3.9	5.6	8.6	10.9	12.4	18.6	25.2	24.7	21.1	12.4	4.1	1.7	149.2
Average snowy days	1.9	1.5	0.3	0	0	0	0	0	0	0.1	0.1	0.3	4.2
Average relative humidity (%)	62	60	62	65	69	78	85	85	85	81	74	67	73
Mean monthly sunshine hours	216.4	195.0	187.7	166.0	154.4	116.2	94.4	113.0	110.7	156.5	204.7	225.2	1,940.2
Percentage possible sunshine	65	61	50	43	37	28	23	28	30	44	63	69	45
Source: China Meteorological Administration All-time October high

== See also ==
- Three Parallel Rivers of Yunnan Protected Areas - UNESCO World Heritage Site
