= Glenn A. Black Laboratory of Archaeology =

Research center at Indiana University

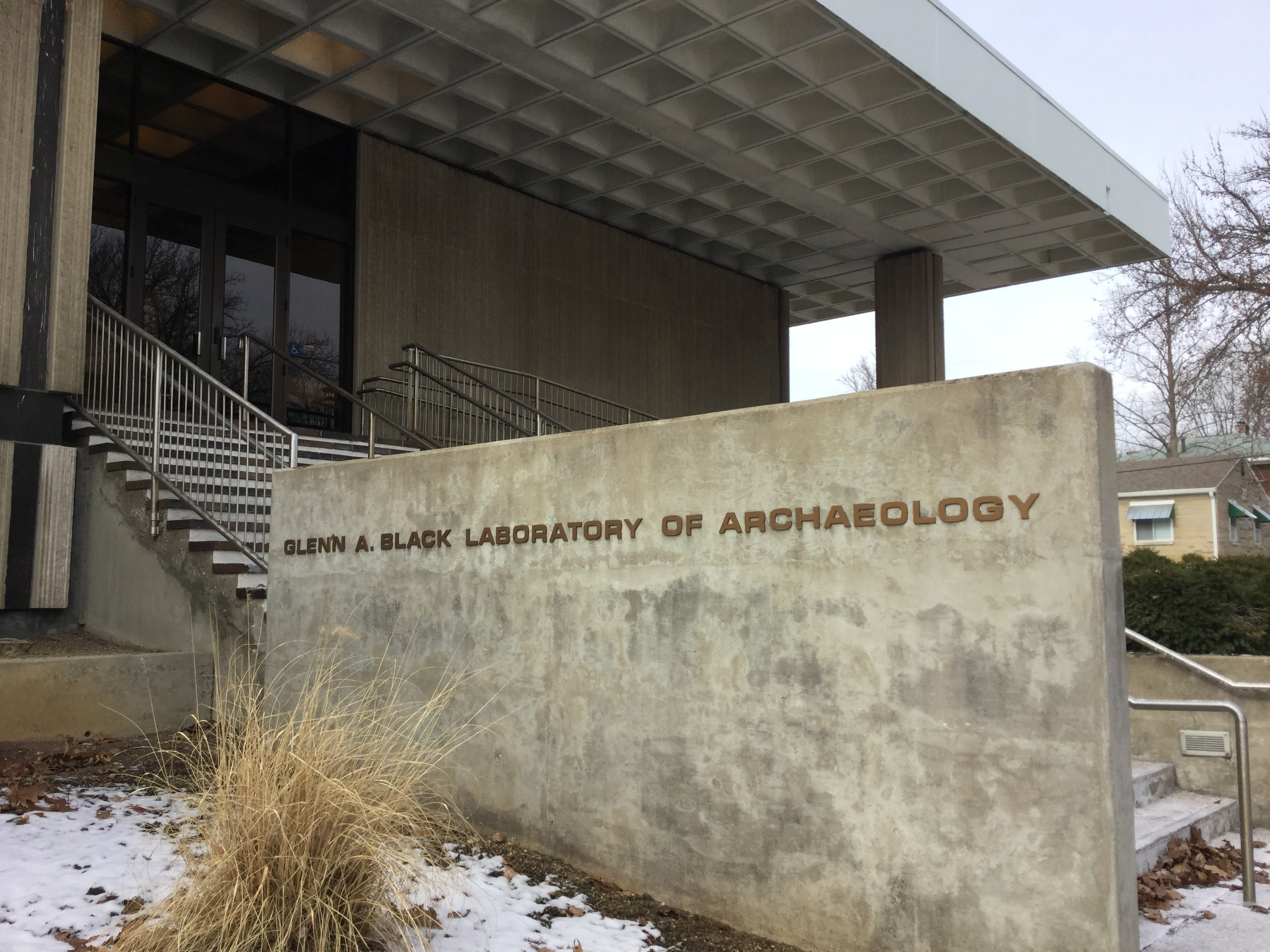
- Established: 1971
- Location: 423 N. Fess Avenue; Indiana University, Bloomington, Indiana
- Coordinates: 39.1699°N 86.5258°W
- Type: Archaeology
- Website: gbl.indiana.edu

The Glenn A. Black Laboratory of Archaeology (GBL) was an archaeology research center and museum located in Bloomington, Indiana. In 2020 the GBL was merged with the Mathers Museum of World Cultures to become the new Indiana University Museum of Archaeology and Anthropology. The GBL was dedicated in honor of Indiana's first professional archaeologist Glenn A. Black. Black's adulthood was devoted to studying the people of Angel Mounds, a site that is still being worked with today.

== History ==
After Glenn A. Black's death in 1964, Eli Lilly began arrangements to construct a building to house his archaeological collections alongside the cultural material from Angel Mounds. James H. Kellar, student of Glenn Black, later hired as Indiana Historical Society archaeologist, and then professor of Anthropology at Indiana University, was selected as the first director of the Glenn A. Black Laboratory of Archaeology.

The design and construction of the building included:

- James H. Kellar, Archaeologist-Consultant, Indiana University, Bloomington
- James Associates, Architects-Engineers, H. Roll McLaughlin, FAIA, Partner in Charge, Indianapolis, Indiana
- Frits Loonsten, Landscape Architect, Indianapolis, Indiana
- James T. Lee and Associates, Mechanical Engineers, Indianapolis, Indiana
- Kimron Construction Company, General Contractors, Indianapolis, Indiana
- Hudson Piping Contractors, Inc., Mechanical Contractors, Seymour, Indiana
- Sanborn Electric Company, Electrical Contractors, Indianapolis, Indiana
- Lilly Endowment, Inc, a major source of funding

The museum was dedicated on April 21, 1971, at the request of Eli Lilly, a close friend of Glenn A. Black, who also endowed the GBL with funds. After Kellar retired in 1986, Christopher Peebles became the center's director. The GBL hosted more than 10 Prehistory Research Fellows who completed their dissertations and assisted with archaeological field research. A cultural resources management (CRM) office was operated from the GBL from 1995 to 2005. April Sievert was appointed director in 2013. For the 2019 State of the University address, then President Michael A. McRobbie announced the merging of the Glenn A. Black Laboratory of Archaeology with the Mathers Museum of World Cultures to form the IU Museum of Archaeology and Anthropology.

== Collections ==
The Glenn A. Black Laboratory of Archaeology holds collections from all over Indiana, materials from 38 other states, and at least 11 other places outside of the United States are included.

=== Archaeological Collections ===
Collections include over 5 million individual objects. Archaeological material includes cultural artifacts both from excavated sites and from donations, as well as natural and geologic collections from many different sites in the Midwest, including Angel Mounds. The Glenn A. Black Laboratory of Archaeology also has multiple types of collections and a teaching collection for use by schools and tour groups.

=== Ethnohistory Collections ===
The Great Lakes and Ohio Valley Ethnohistory Collection contains materials compiled by Erminie Wheeler-Voegelin. These materials describe the history and land usage of groups/tribes in the Ohio Valley and Great Lakes region from the 1600s until the late 1900s, and records the information gathered by the Indian Claims Commissions (ICC). According to the GBL's website, "This collection contains 469 linear feet of material and is available for use by researchers."

=== Image/Film Collections ===
The Glenn A. Black Laboratory of Archaeology has an extensive image collection: it has over 12,000 photographs, 9,000 negatives, 8,200 slides, 50 glass plate images, and 100 16 mm film reels. These materials portray the history of archaeological work in the Midwest since the 1920s. Eli Lilly, Warren K. Moorehead, and Glenn A. Black are some of the professionals shown in these images and films.

=== Library/Archive Collections ===
The library and archives located at the GBL are available for on-site research only.

==== James H. Kellar Library ====
The James H. Kellar library contains books and other resources available for study. Some materials include: field excavation research reports, maps of individual sites in Indiana, documents conveying the history of the Glenn Black Laboratory of Archaeology, and many other books relating to archaeology.

==== Erminie Wheeler-Voegelin Archives ====
These archives contain:

- The Great Lakes-Ohio Valley Ethnohistory Collection
- Eli LIlly Archaeology Papers
- Glenn A. Black Papers
- James H. Kellar Papers
- Jack C. Householder Papers
- Noel D. Justice Papers
- Christopher S. Peebles Papers
- Warren K. Moorehead Papers
- Edward V. McMichael Papers
- Douglas S. Byers Papers
- Clifford Anderson Papers
- George K. Neuman Papers
- Sherri Hilgeman Papers
- Midwest Archaeological Conference Records
- Cheryl Munson Papers
- Glenn A. Black Laboratory of Archaeology Institutional Records

Taken directly from the GBL's website.

==== GBL Fieldwork Archives ====
The Glenn A. Black Laboratory's Fieldwork Archives hold maps, field books, excavation information, and more. Documents relating to Angel Mounds (1939–1965), CRM projects, GBL Field schools, donations, state and federal collections, and records for the Indiana Historical Society are included in this archive.

=== Midwest Lithic Repository ===
The GBL's Lithic Raw Material Repository was constructed to create an easier understanding of raw materials from different regions. This repository records over 500 samples of lithics gathered from North America, specifically the Northwest region. Archaeologists, museums, and the government can use this collection to identify types of lithics and work on type collections.
