= Anthropological Linguistics (journal) =

Academic journal

- Discipline: Anthropological Linguistics
- Language: English
- Edited by: Anthony K. Webster

Publication details
- History: 1959–present
- Publisher: University of Nebraska Press (United States)
- Frequency: Quarterly
- Open access: Delayed, after 2 years

Standard abbreviations
- ISO 4: Anthropol. Linguist.

Indexing
- ISSN: 0003-5483 (print); 1944-6527 (web)
- LCCN: 71004564
- JSTOR: 00035483

Links
- Journal homepage

Anthropological Linguistics is an American peer-reviewed academic journal covering studies on anthropological linguistics. It was established in 1959 by the Department of Anthropology of Indiana University. The department currently publishes it in association with the University of Nebraska Press and the American Indian Studies Research Institute.

== Abstracting and indexing ==
The journal is abstracted and indexed in:

- Anthropological Literature
- Communication & Mass Media Index
- CSA (Note: Merged with ProQuest in 2007.) (Linguistics & Language Behavior Abstracts, Sociological Abstracts)
- EBSCO databases (Academic Search)
- Humanities Abstracts
- Index Islamicus
- International Bibliography of Periodical Literature
- International Bibliography of the Social Sciences
- Linguistic Bibliography
- Modern Language Association
- ProQuest (Periodicals Index Online)
- Scopus
