= Rung languages =

Proposed branch of the Sino-Tibetan languages

Rung
- Eastern Tibeto-Burman
- Geographic distribution: China, Burma, Nepal, India
- Linguistic classification: Sino-Tibetan: Rung
- Subdivisions: Rgyalrongic (?); Nungish; Kiranti; Magaric; West Himalayan

Language codes
- Glottolog: None

The Rung languages are a proposed branch of Sino-Tibetan languages. The branch was proposed by Randy LaPolla on the basis of morphological evidence such as pronominal paradigms. However, Guillaume Jacques and Thomas Pellard (2021) argues that these languages do not constitute a monophyly based on phylogenetic studies and on a thorough investigation of shared lexical innovations.

LaPolla (2003) lists the following languages as part of his provisional "Rung" group.

- Rung
  - Rgyalrongic (also often included into the Qiangic branch)
  - Nungish
    - T'rung (Dulong)
    - Anong
    - Rawang
  - Kiranti
  - West Himalayan (Kinauri-Almora)
    - Kinauri
    - Almora
  - Kham
  - Magar
  - Chepang

Kham, Magar, and Chepangic have also been proposed to form part of a Greater Magaric group.
