= Trung =

Trung may refer to:

- Derung people, also known as Trung people, an ethnic minority in Viet Nam
- Derung language, also known as the Trung language, a Sino-Tibetan language spoken by Derung people
- Trưng Sisters (fl. 12–43), Vietnamese sisters who rebelled against the Eastern Han dynasty
- T'rưng, a bamboo xylophone used by the Jarai people and Bahnar people in Vietnam's Central Highlands

== See also ==
- Taraon language, a Sino-Tibetan language spoken in Arunachal Pradesh, India
- Taron people, an ethnic minority in northern Myanmar, possibly descendants of the Derung people
- Zhong (disambiguation)
