= Nung language =

Nung language may refer to:

- Nung language (Sino-Tibetan), a Sino-Tibetan language of China and Myanmar
- Nung language (Tai), a Kra-Dai language of Vietnam, China and Laos

== See also ==
- Nung (disambiguation)
- Nungish languages, a Sino-Tibetan language family
