= Nusu =

Nusu may refer to:

- Nusu language
- Nu people or Nusu
- NUSU, Newcastle University Students' Union
