= Metu =

Metu or METU may refer to:

- Metu, Ethiopia, market town in Ethiopia
- Metu language, dialect of Derung language
- Middle East Technical University, METU, in Ankara, Turkey

== People with the surname ==
- Chimezie Metu (born 1997), Nigerian-American basketball player
- Obinna Metu (born 1988), Nigerian sprinter
