= Taron people =

Ethnic group of Myanmar

Total population
- 179 (2015)

Regions with significant populations
- Myanmar

Languages
- Derung, L2: Rawang, L3: Jingpo, L4: Burmese

Religion
- Animism, Christianity, Theravada

Related ethnic groups
- Derung, Nu, Rawang

The Taron or T’rung (Burmese: တရုမ်း [ta.rumː]) are an ethnic group in the Himalayan foothills of northern Kachin State, Myanmar, whose population is declining to the point where they may disappear entirely. They have been referred to as the "East Asian pygmies". They are allegedly descended from an ethnic group concentrated in China known as Derung who migrated to Burma from Tibet in the 1880s.

Like the Pygmies of Central Africa and the Negritos of Southeast Asia, the Tarons are very small, with an average height of 149 centimetres (4 ft 11 in) for males, and 140 centimetres (4 ft 7 in) for females.

== History ==
The Tarons have received their name from their original homeland, the headwaters of the Taron River (Derong/Dulong). Leaving their original homeland around 200 years ago, the Tarons moved into Burma territory through the Thalalarkha mountain pass. They settled in Kachin State, in the lower Adunlaung River valley in the Naung Mun Township of Putao District. The landscape is dense forests and difficult terrain, with torrential streams and snow-clad mountains that are home to rare wild animals such as the blue sheep and the leaf deer.

In the 1960s, a Burmese research expedition found over 50 pure-blood pygmies, and although cases of congenital iodine deficiency syndrome, intellectual disability, goiter, spasticity and other physical and mental ailments were noted, they felt as though the community would sustain itself.

A 1997 field trip commissioned by the Kachin State Peace and Development Council revealed that only eight individuals of pure Taron stock remained. It makes the Taron one of the most highly endangered human populations in the world today.

Alan Rabinowitz visited their village to learn about the Taron pygmies in the late 1990s, and discovered the fate of the tribe. Dawi, age 39, the youngest remaining pure-blood Taron, explained that Taron babies were being born with increasingly severe birth defects, without any known cause. The Taron elders decided that their population would go extinct rather than risk any more misshapen children. As a child, Dawi's father demanded that he would not marry or have children. Rabinowitz's visit was followed by anthropologist P. Christiaan Klieger of the California Academy of Sciences in 2003. Then, Dawi announced he would travel to Tibet or Yunnan in order to search for a wife, since many Taron/Dulong people lived there.

== Link with the Derung people ==
It has been proposed by Richard D. Fisher that the Taron people are descended from the Derung people who are based in the Dulong Valley in Yunnan, China. There are currently approximately 5,000 ethnic Derung people living in six designated villages within the valley. This is based on Klieger's work Derung is simply a Chinese term for Taron or T'rung.

Genetic similarities between the two ethnic groups have been observed, and it has been purported that all the Taron people were derived from three Derung people who migrated from Tibet to Myanmar in the 1880s.

== Culture ==
Most Tarong, like their neighbouring Rawang, practice Christianity. They previously practised a form of animism, with rites of passage led by a shaman called nam'sa.
