= Zauzou language =

Loloish language spoken in Yunnan, China

Zauzou
- Rouruo
- Native to: China
- Region: Yunnan
- Ethnicity: Nu
- Native speakers: 2,100 (2007)
- Language family: Sino-Tibetan: (Tibeto-Burman); Lolo–Burmese; Loloish; Nusoish; Zauzou

Language codes
- ISO 639-3: zal
- Glottolog: zauz1238
- ELP: Zauzou
- Zauzou is classified as Vulnerable by the UNESCO Atlas of the World's Languages in Danger

Zauzou (Rouruo 柔若, Jaojo, Raorou; autonym: zau55 zou33) is a Loloish language of Tu'e District (兔峨地区), Lanping County, Yunnan, China. It is most closely related to Nusu.

== Distribution ==
In Tu'e District, Rouruo is spoken in Tu'e (兔峨), Bijifeng (碧鸡风), Wupijiang (吾批江), Guoli (果力), Xiaocun (小村), Jiangmo (江末), and a few other locations. The two major dialects are Guoli (果力) and Jiangmo (江末). Sun (2002) provides extensive vocabulary word lists for the Guoli (果力) and Jiangmo (江末) dialects.

== Innovations ==
Lama (2012) observes a sound change of *r- > Ø from Proto-Loloish as a Nusoish innovation.

== Works cited ==
- Sun, Hongkai 孙宏开 (2002). Róuruòyǔ yánjiū 柔若语研究 [A Study of Rouruo] (in Chinese). Beijing Shi: Zhongyang minzu daxue chubanshe.
