= Yunnan Ethnic Village =

Ethnographic village in Yunnan, China

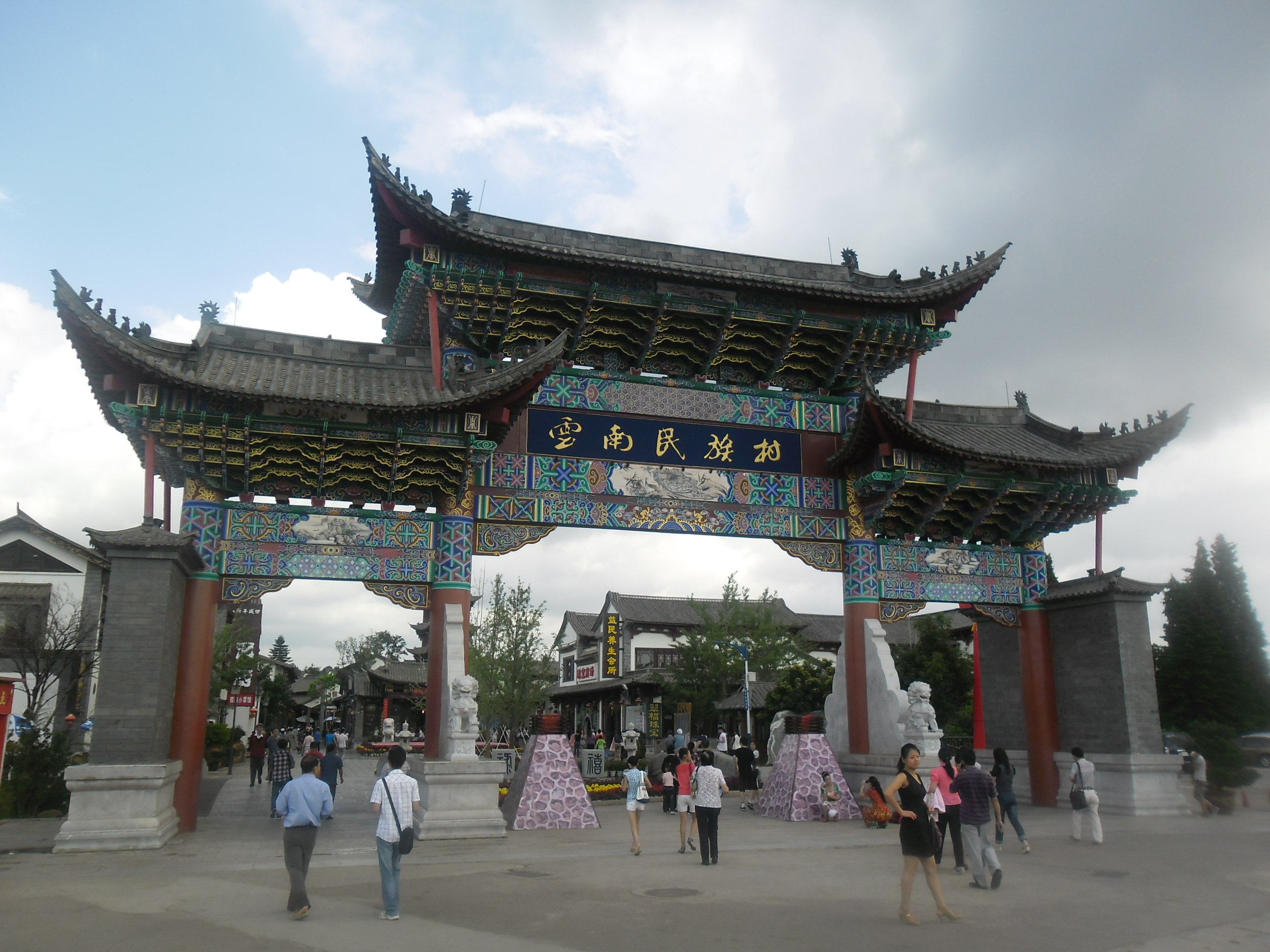
The entrance to the Yunnan Ethnic Village

The Yunnan Ethnic Village (Chinese: 云南民族村; pinyin: Yúnnán Mínzú Cūn) is an ethnographic village and theme park that displays the various folklore, culture, and architecture of 26 ethnic groups in Yunnan Province, China. The park's major goal is mainly to display some aspects of Yunnan's ethnicity, cultural diversity, and heritage. Located in the southwest suburbs of Kunming next to Dianchi lake, Yunnan Ethnic Village covers an area of 89 hectares including 31 hectares of water. It is classified as a AAAA-class tourist attraction.

== Ethnic groups represented ==
The following ethnic groups are represented in the Yunnan Ethnic Village:

- Dai (Chinese: 傣族; pinyin: Dǎizú)
- Bai (白族; Báizú)
- Yi (彝族; Yízú)
- Naxi (纳西族; Nàxīzú)
- Wa (佤族; Wǎzú)
- Bulang (布朗族; Bùlǎngzú)
- Jinuo (基诺族; Jīnuòzú)
- Lahu (拉祜族; Lāhùzú)
- Tibetan (藏族; Zàngzú)
- Jingpo (景颇族; Jǐngpōzú)
- Hani (哈尼族; Hānízú)
- De Ang (德昂族; Déángzú)
- Zhuang (壮族; Zhuàngzú)
- Hmong (苗族; Miáozú)
- Shui (水族; Shuǐzú)
- Nu (怒族; Nùzú)
- Mongol (蒙古族; Měnggǔzú)
- Buyi (布依族; Bùyīzú)
- Dulong (独龙族; Dúlóngzú)
- Lisu (傈僳族; Lìsùzú)
- Pumi (普米族; Pǔmǐzú)
- Manchu (满族; Mǎnzú)
- Hui (回族; Huízú)
- Yao (瑶族; Yáozú)
- Achang (阿昌族; Āchāngzú)

== Special events ==
- Water-Splashing Festival (April 13-16) of Dai minority
- Torch Festival (June 24 in the lunar calendar) of Yi minority
- New Rice Festival (新米节:pinyin: xīn mǐ jié) of Jinuo minority, from the end of July to the beginning of August

== Transport ==
1310 Dianchi Road, Kunming, Yunnan. It is served by buses No. 44, 73, and A1.

== See also ==
- China Folk Culture Village
