= Nung Rawang =

Tibeto-Burman ethnic group in northern Myanmar, India, and China

Rawang
Rvwang

Total population
- ~100,000

Regions with significant populations
- Myanmar (Kachin State); India (Arunachal Pradesh); China (Yunnan)

Languages
- Rawang, Jinghpaw, Burmese

Religion
- Christianity (majority), Animism

Related ethnic groups
- Taron, Nung, Derung, Yi, Bamar

The Rawang people (Burmese: ရဝမ်လူမျိုး) are a Tibeto-Burman ethnic group who inhabit far northern Kachin State of Burma (Myanmar), especially in the Putao District. Myanmar is home to an estimated 65,000–70,000 Rawang, while related groups live in neighboring parts of China and India.

== Etymology ==
The term Rawang is argued to shortening of the term rvméváwng (transl. Middle River) as they descended from the north via the Mekong routes and valleys. However, China recognises the group as part of the Derung people.

== History and Origins ==
According to cultural research and oral traditions, the Rawang ancestors (historically known as the "Khu-Nung" or "Nung") migrated from the Tibetan Plateau and northwestern China southward into the Three Parallel Rivers region of Yunnan. During the second millennium, they moved southwest into northern Burma, settling in the remote valleys of the May Hka and Mali Hka rivers. They are closely related to the Nu people and Derung people who live across the border in China.

Several names of Chinese, Lisu and Tibetan locations have been argued to be adoptions of Rawang names, particularly in the Salween Valley. Several of the locations were named in Rawang languages to describe the contour of the land such as Yoraggang (transl. cloth weaving flat) into the Lisu name Yulaga. The Rawang are estimated to have come from the Upper Mekong Valley were many of these names have ben adopted and reused by Lisu, Tibetan and Chinese inhabitants. It has been argued that funerary and religious chants tracing the path of the soul retrace the original migration routes of the Rawang people and their ancestors over time. Because the language is archaic during such retellings, many of these locations and migration routes have lost their meaning or identification.

According to oral history, the Rawang narrate settling in the land of Putao in upper Myanmar. Oral history recounts early clashes with Naga tribes during hunting expeditions. While the Naga tribes has settled further south, the Mishmi people settled in the general area and absorbed a few of the Rawang clans. The Mishmi and the Rawang held good relations in the area of Li-Pu-Dam at the headwaters of the Mali kha River. Due to Tibetan raids in the Mongdam area of the China-Burma border, where the Daru (Dvru) clan of the Rawang were taken as slaves to Tibet, the clan adopted a policy of tattooing the faces of their women to identify them. Oral history in the Daur clan claim to be unable to build houses in forests out of fear of Tibetan encroachment and adopted a tradition of camouflaged camps in forests. As late as the British era, in 1910, the Daru were said to live in nests in the trees.

During the British colonial period, the Rawang were often associated with legends of "pygmy tribes" due to the short stature of certain sub-groups, such as the Taron. Modern anthropology identifies them as part of the Nungish speaking branch of the Tibeto-Burman family.

== Genetics ==
Modern genetic studies have revealed that the Rawang maintain a high degree of ancestral genetic components from the early Tibeto-Burman migrations.Rawang males predominantly carry Haplogroup O2 (M122) and Haplogroup D (M174). The presence of Haplogroup D indicates a significant genetic link to ancient Paleolithic Tibetan populations, which is more pronounced in the Rawang than in many other Southeast Asian Tibeto-Burman groups. Studies of mitochondrial DNA show haplogroups such as M9a and F1g, reflecting a mixture of high-altitude northern Asian and mainland Southeast Asian genetic markers. Research shows that the Rawang are genetically closer to the Bamar people and Lisu people than to the Tibetans, due to shared migration routes and long-term isolation in the highlands which preserved their ancestral DNA markers.

== Sources ==
- Lapai, Suzan (1975). Rawang Migration Routes and Oral Tradition. Indiana: Indiana University.
- Lapolla, Randy J. (2000). "Valency-changing derivation in Dulong/Rawang". In Dixon, R. M. W.; Aikhenvald, Alexandra Y. (eds.). Changing Valency: Case Studies in Transitivity. Cambridge: Cambridge University Press.
