= Nung =

Nung may refer to:

- Nùng people, a Tai-speaking ethnic group of Vietnam and China
- Chinese Nùng, a group of ethnic Chinese of Vietnam
- Nùng language (Tai), a Kra-Dai language of Vietnam, China and Laos
- Nung language (Sino-Tibetan), a Sino-Tibetan language of China and Myanmar
- Yue Chinese language, also called Chinese Nung
- Nung/Nong, Chinese surname (農 / 农)
