= Yunnan Nationalities Museum =

Museum in Kunming, Yunnan, China

- 云南民族博物馆
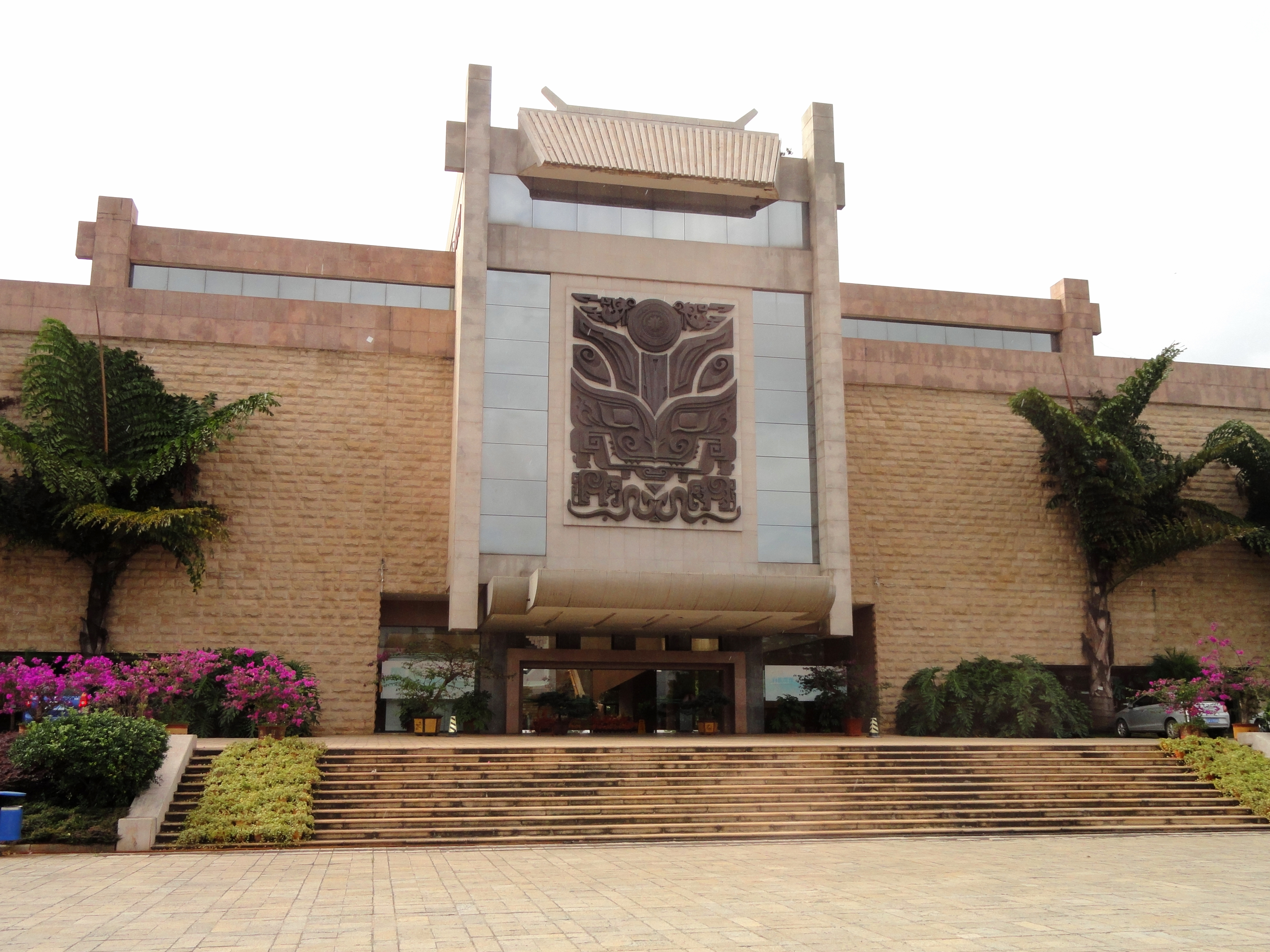
- The Yunnan Nationalities Museum in 2011
- Established: 1995
- Location: Kunming, Yunnan, China
- Coordinates: 24°58′07″N 102°40′04″E
- Website: ynnmuseum.cn

The Yunnan Nationalities Museum (Chinese: 云南民族博物馆; pinyin: Yúnnán Mínzú Bówùguǎn) is located on the east bank of Dian Lake in Kunming, Yunnan, China, next to the Yunnan Ethnic Village. Opened on 9 November 1995, it is a comprehensive ethnology museum. Covering an area of over 200 mu, the museum has a building area of 130,000 square metres (1,400,000 sq ft). It consists of various exhibition halls, office building, report hall, storage and workshops. The ecological environment, religious customs, culture and arts and relics of the ethnic groups of Yunnan are collected in it. The 120,000 items of objects fall into the 16 categories such as ethnic groups, dresses and personal adornment, technique, arts, ecology, ancient books, and strange stones etc.

== See also ==
- List of museums in China
