= Pygmy peoples =

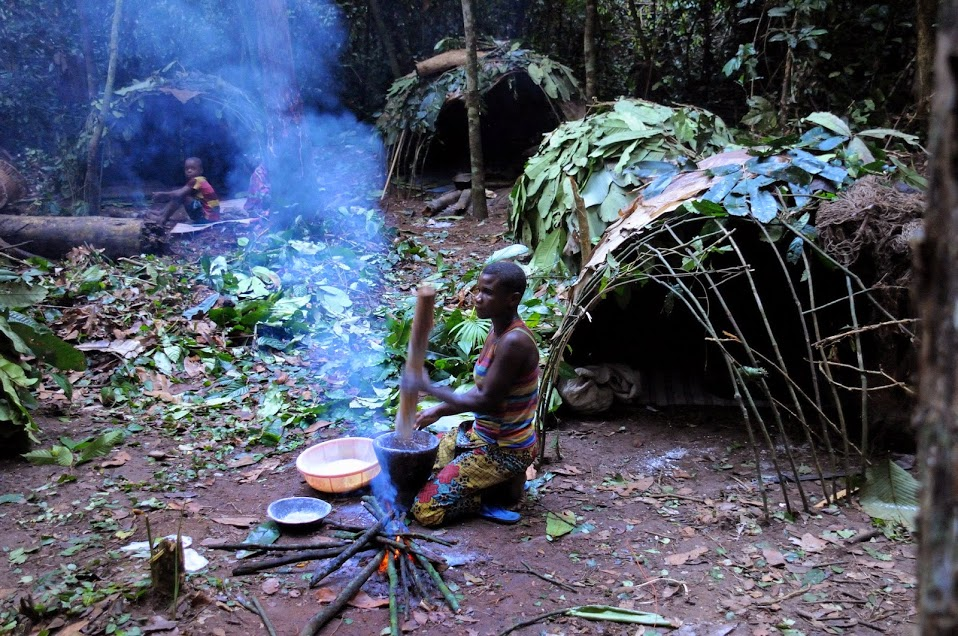
- Aka Pygmies in the Congo Basin in August 2014

Total population
- 920,000 (2016)

Regions with significant populations
- Central Africa, Oceania, Southeast Asia
- DR Congo: 552,000

In anthropology, pygmy peoples are ethnic groups whose average height is unusually short. The term pygmyism is used to describe the phenotype of endemic short stature (as opposed to disproportionate dwarfism occurring in isolated cases in a population) for populations in which adult men are on average less than 150 cm (4 ft 11 in) tall.

Although the term is sometimes considered derogatory because it focuses on a physical trait, it remains the primary term associated with the African Pygmies, the hunter-gatherers of the Congo Basin (comprising the Bambenga, Bambuti and Batwa). The terms "Asiatic pygmies" and "Oceanic pygmies" have also been used to describe the Negrito populations of Southeast Asia and Australo-Melanesian peoples of short stature. The Taron people of Myanmar are an exceptional case of a pygmy population of East Asian phenotype.

== Etymology ==
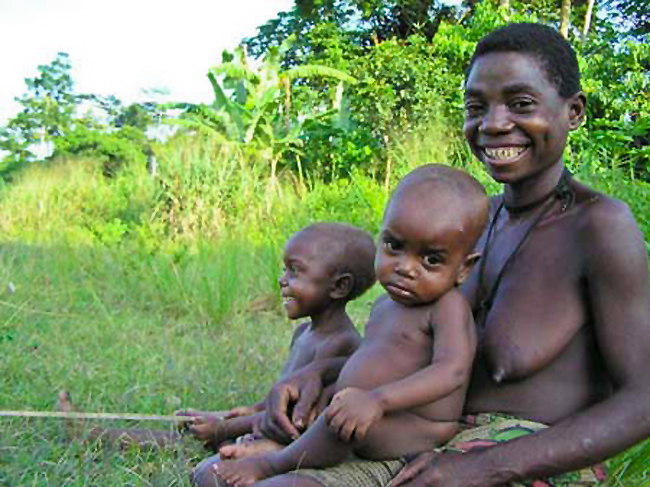
A family from a Ba Aka pygmy village

The term pygmy, as used to refer to diminutive people, comes via Latin pygmaeus from Greek πυγμαῖος pygmaîos, derived from πυγμή pygmḗ, meaning "short cubit", or a measure of length corresponding to the distance from the elbow to the first knuckle of the middle finger, meant to express pygmies' diminutive stature.

In Greek mythology and classical natural history, the word denoted a tribe of diminutive people first described by the ancient Greek poet Homer, and reputed to live to the south of modern-day Ethiopia or in India. For example, Aristotle described them thus in his History of Animals (while discussing cranes that migrate south of Egypt): "The story is not fabulous, but there is in reality a race of dwarfish men, and the horses are little in proportion, and the men live in caves underground."

Many African pygmies prefer to be identified by their ethnicity, such as the Aka (Mbenga), Baka, Mbuti, and Twa. The term Bayaka, the plural form of the Aka/Yaka, is sometimes used in the Central African Republic to refer to all local pygmies. Likewise, the Kongo word Bambenga is used in Congo. In other parts of Africa, they are called Wochua or Achua. In French-speaking Africa, they are sometimes referred to adjectivally as autochthon (autochtone), meaning "native" or "indigenous".

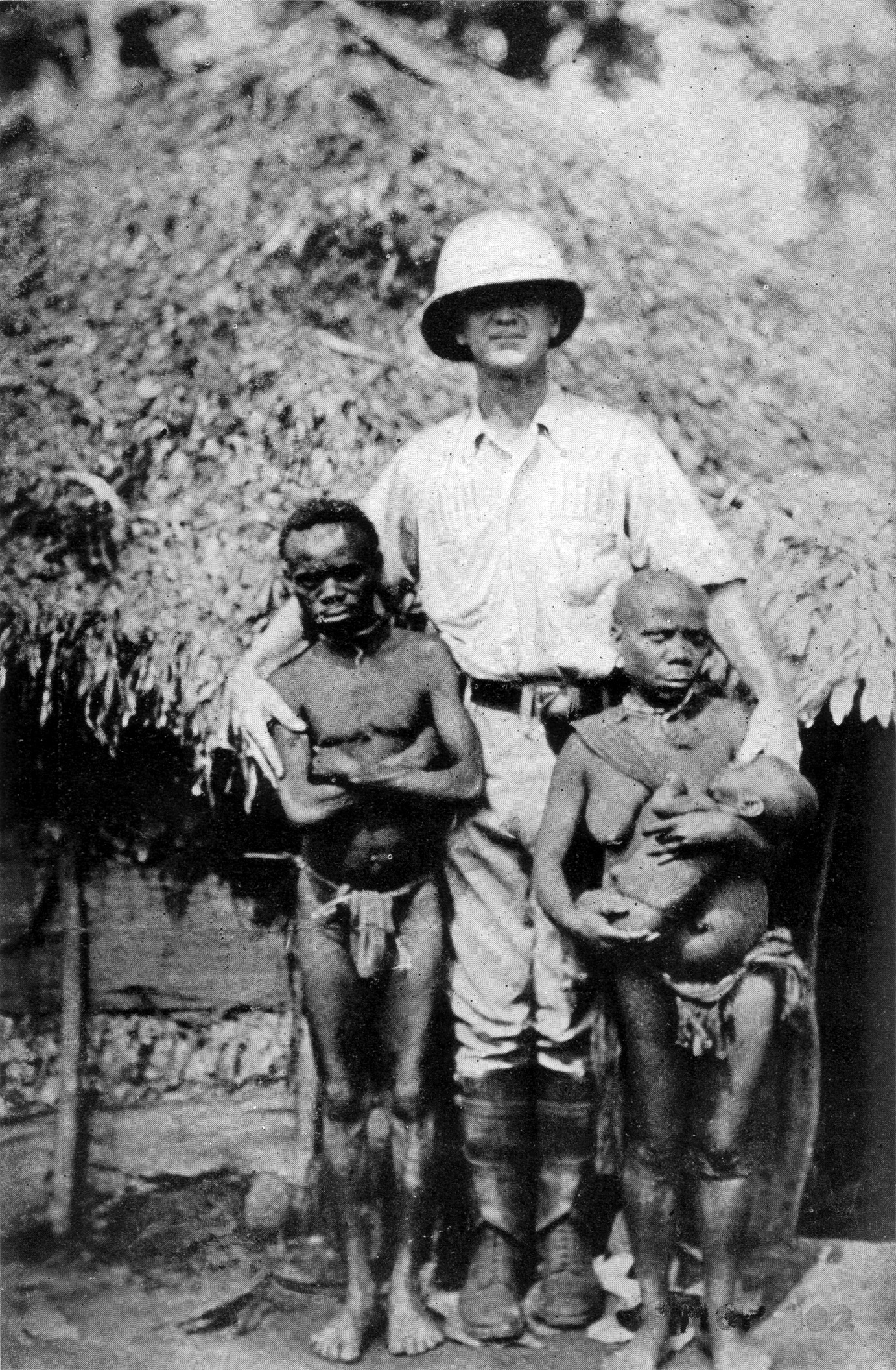
African pygmies and a European visitor, c. 1921

== Short stature ==
Various theories have been proposed to explain the short stature of pygmies. Some studies suggest that it could be related to adaptation to low ultraviolet light levels in rainforests. This might mean that relatively little vitamin D can be made in human skin, thereby limiting calcium uptake from the diet for bone growth and maintenance and leading to the evolution of the small skeletal size.

Other explanations attribute pygmism to lack of food in the rainforest environment, low calcium levels in the soil, the need to move through dense jungle, adaptation to heat and humidity, or as an association with rapid reproductive maturation under conditions of early mortality. Other evidence points towards unusually low levels of expression of the genes encoding the growth hormone receptor and growth hormone compared to the related tribal groups, associated with low serum levels of insulin-like growth factor 1 and short stature.

== Life expectancy ==
Pygmy populations have an average life expectancy of 49 years. This varies among the populations, with others, such as the Bayaka, having an average life expectancy of 24 years. The high mortality rates are due to poor nutrition, lack of medical care, extreme poverty, and attacks from armed hunters. Studies have also linked this to low survival to adulthood, with 30% to 50% of the children reaching adulthood.

== Africa ==
African Pygmies live in several ethnic groups in Rwanda, Burundi, Uganda, Democratic Republic of the Congo, Republic of the Congo (ROC), Central African Republic, Cameroon, Equatorial Guinea, Gabon, Angola, Botswana, Namibia, Madagascar, and Zambia. There are at least a dozen pygmy groups, sometimes unrelated to each other. The best known are the Mbenga (Aka and Baka) of the western Congo Basin, who speak Bantu and Ubangian languages; the Mbuti (Efe etc.) of the Ituri Rainforest, who speak Bantu and Central Sudanic languages, and the Twa of the African Great Lakes, who speak Bantu Rundi and Kiga. Most pygmy communities are partially hunter-gatherers, living partially but not exclusively on the wild products of their environment. They trade with neighbouring farmers to acquire cultivated foods and other material items; no group lives deep in the forest without access to agricultural products. It is estimated that there are between 250,000 and 600,000 Pygmies living in the Congo rainforest. However, although Pygmies are thought of as forest people, the groups called Twa may live in open swamp or desert.

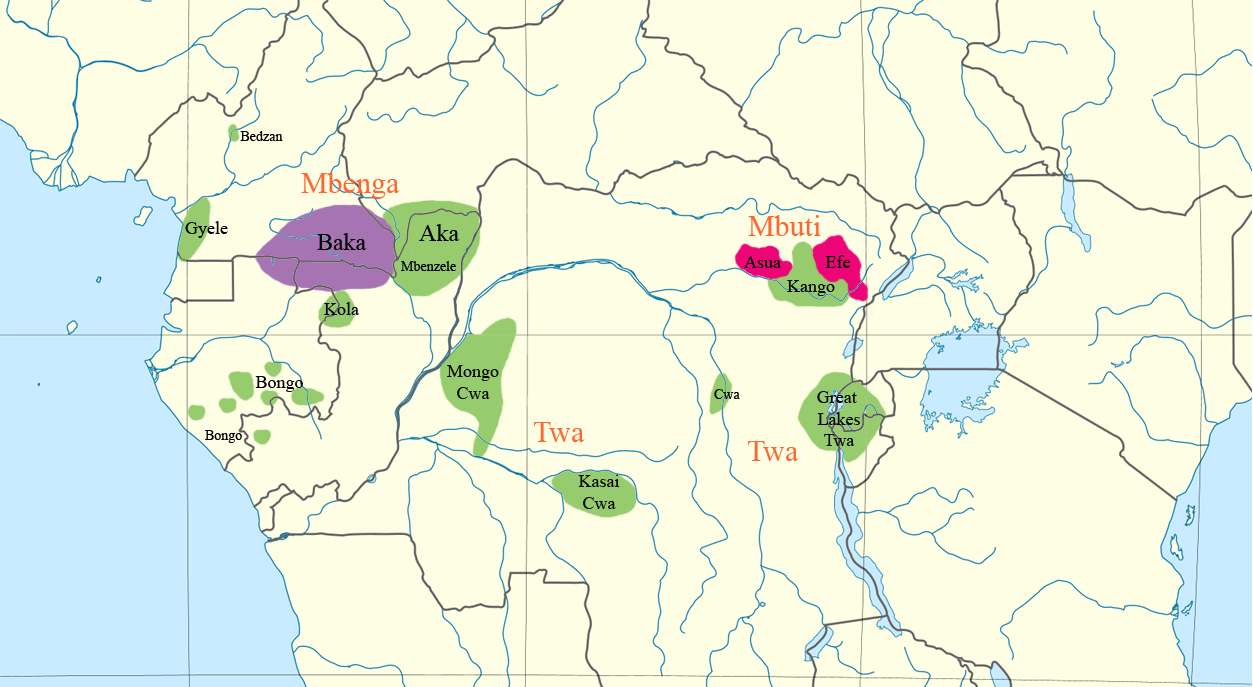
Distribution of Pygmies and their languages according to Bahuchet (2006). The southern Twa are not shown.

=== Origins ===
Expansion to Central Africa by the ancestors of African Pygmies most likely took place before 130,000 years ago, and certainly before 60,000 years ago. A commonly held belief is that African Pygmies are the direct descendants of Late Stone Age hunter-gatherer peoples of the central African rainforest, who were partially absorbed or displaced by later immigration of agricultural peoples, and adopted their Central Sudanic, Ubangian, and Bantu languages.

Some 30% of Aka language is not Bantu, and a similar percentage of Baka language is not Ubangian. Much of pygmy vocabulary is botanical, dealing with honey collecting, or is otherwise specialized for the forest and is shared between the two western pygmy groups. It has been proposed that this is the remnant of an independent western pygmy (Mbenga or "Baaka") language. However, this type of vocabulary is subject to widespread borrowing among the Pygmies and neighboring peoples, and the "Baaka" language was only reconstructed to the 15th century.

African Pygmy populations are genetically diverse and extremely divergent from all other human populations, suggesting they have an ancient indigenous lineage. Their uniparental markers represent the second-most ancient divergence, after those typically found in Khoisan peoples. Recent advances in genetics shed some light on the origins of the various Pygmy groups. Researchers found "an early divergence of the ancestors of Pygmy hunter-gatherers and farming populations 60,000 years ago, followed by a split of the Pygmies' ancestors into the Western and Eastern pygmy groups 20,000 years ago."

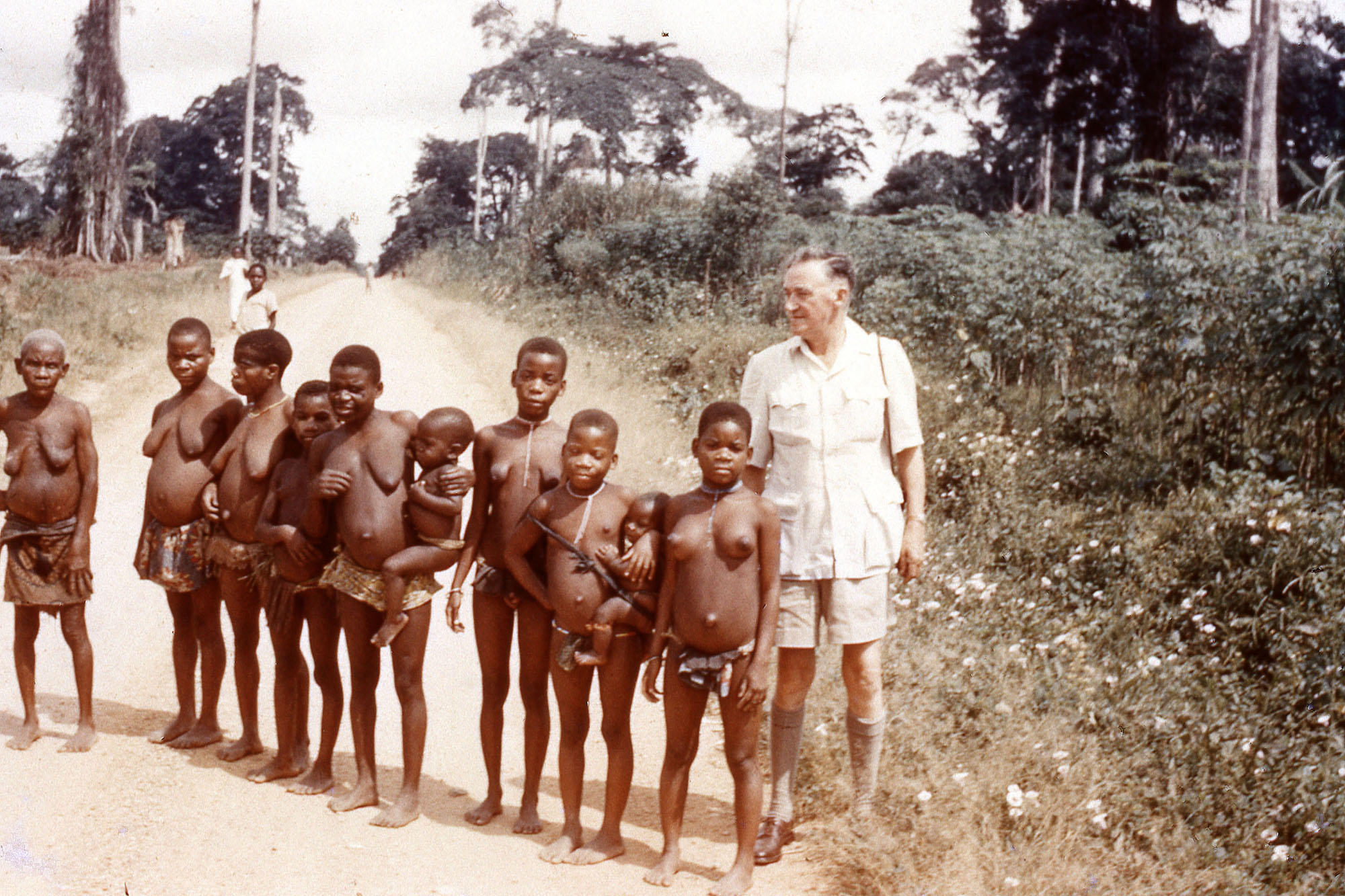
Pygmies of the Ituri Rainforest

New evidence suggests East and West African Pygmy children have different growth patterns. The difference between the two groups may indicate the Pygmies' short stature did not start with their common ancestor but instead evolved independently in adapting to similar environments, which adds support that some sets of genes related to height were advantageous in Eastern Pygmy populations, but not in Western Pygmy populations.

However, Roger Blench argues that the Pygmies are not descended from residual hunter-gatherer groups but rather are offshoots of larger neighboring ethnolinguistic groups that had adopted forest subsistence strategies. Blench notes the lack of clear linguistic and archaeological evidence for the antiquity of pygmy cultures and peoples and also notes that the genetic evidence can be problematic. Blench also notes that there is no evidence of the Pygmies having hunting technology distinctive from that of their neighbors, and argues that the short stature of pygmy populations can arise relatively quickly (in less than a few millennia) due to strong selection pressures.

=== Culture ===
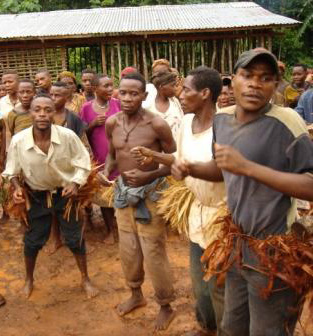
Baka pygmy dancers in the East Region of Cameroon

The African Pygmies are particularly known for their usually vocal music, usually characterised by dense contrapuntal communal improvisation. Simha Arom says that the level of polyphonic complexity of pygmy music was reached in Europe in the 14th century, yet Pygmy culture is unwritten and ancient. Music permeates daily life and there are songs for entertainment as well as specific events and activities.

=== Violence against pygmies ===
==== Reported genocides ====
The pygmy population was a target of the Interahamwe during the 1994 Rwandan genocide. Of the 30,000 Pygmies in Rwanda, an estimated 10,000 were killed and another 10,000 were displaced. They have been described as "forgotten victims" of the genocide.

From the end of 2002 through January 2003 around 60,000 Pygmy civilians and 10,000 combatants were killed and often cannibalized in an extermination campaign known as "Effacer le tableau" during the Second Congo War. Human rights activists have made demands for the massacre to be recognized as genocide.

==== Forced removal ====
In a strategy described as fortress conservation, the conservation efforts of national parks, often financed by international organizations such as the World Wildlife Fund, can involve heavily armed park rangers removing native pygmies from the land. However, some have argued that the most efficient conservation methods involve giving land rights to the land's indigenous inhabitants. This pattern of eviction has been seen in national parks in the Democratic Republic of the Congo, such as Kahuzi-Biéga National Park, where pygmy inhabitants often cut the trees down to sell charcoal. In the Republic of the Congo, this is seen in the Messok Dja protected area. In Cameroon, this is seen in the Lobéké National Park. In Uganda, some Batwa have been removed from land reclassified as national parks, such as the Mgahinga Gorilla National Park, which is home to the endangered mountain gorilla.

==== Contemporary enslavement ====
In the Republic of the Congo, where Pygmies make up 2% of the population, many Pygmies live as slaves to Bantu masters. The nation is deeply stratified between these two major ethnic groups. The Pygmy slaves belong to their Bantu masters from birth in a relationship that the Bantus call "a time-honored tradition". A 2007 news report stated that even though Pygmies are responsible for much of the hunting, fishing and manual labor in jungle villages, "Pygmies and Bantus alike say that Pygmies are often paid at the master's whim: in cigarettes, used clothing, or even nothing at all." As a result of pressure from UNICEF and human-rights activists, in 2009, a law that would grant special protections to the Pygmy people was awaiting a vote by the Congo parliament. According to reports made in 2013, this law was never passed. In 2022, after decades of facing these conditions and working to get legal protections for the Pygmies, a group of 45 indigenous organizations successfully petitioned the Democratic Republic of the Congo (DRC) government, and the Promotion and Protection of the Rights of the Indigenous Pygmy Peoples, the first legislation in the country that recognizes and safeguards the specific rights of the Indigenous pygmy peoples, was signed into law.

In the Democratic Republic of the Congo, during the Ituri conflict, Ugandan-backed rebel groups were accused by the UN of enslaving Mbutis to prospect for minerals and forage for forest food, with those returning empty handed being killed and eaten.

==== Ethnic conflict ====
In Northern Katanga Province starting in 2013, the Pygmy Batwa people, whom the Luba people often exploit and allegedly enslave, rose up into militias, such as the "Perci" militia, and attacked Luba villages. A Luba militia known as "Elements" counterattacked. More than a thousand people were killed in the first eight months of 2014 alone with the number of displaced people estimated to be 650,000 as of December 2017. The weapons used in the conflict are often arrows and axes, rather than guns.

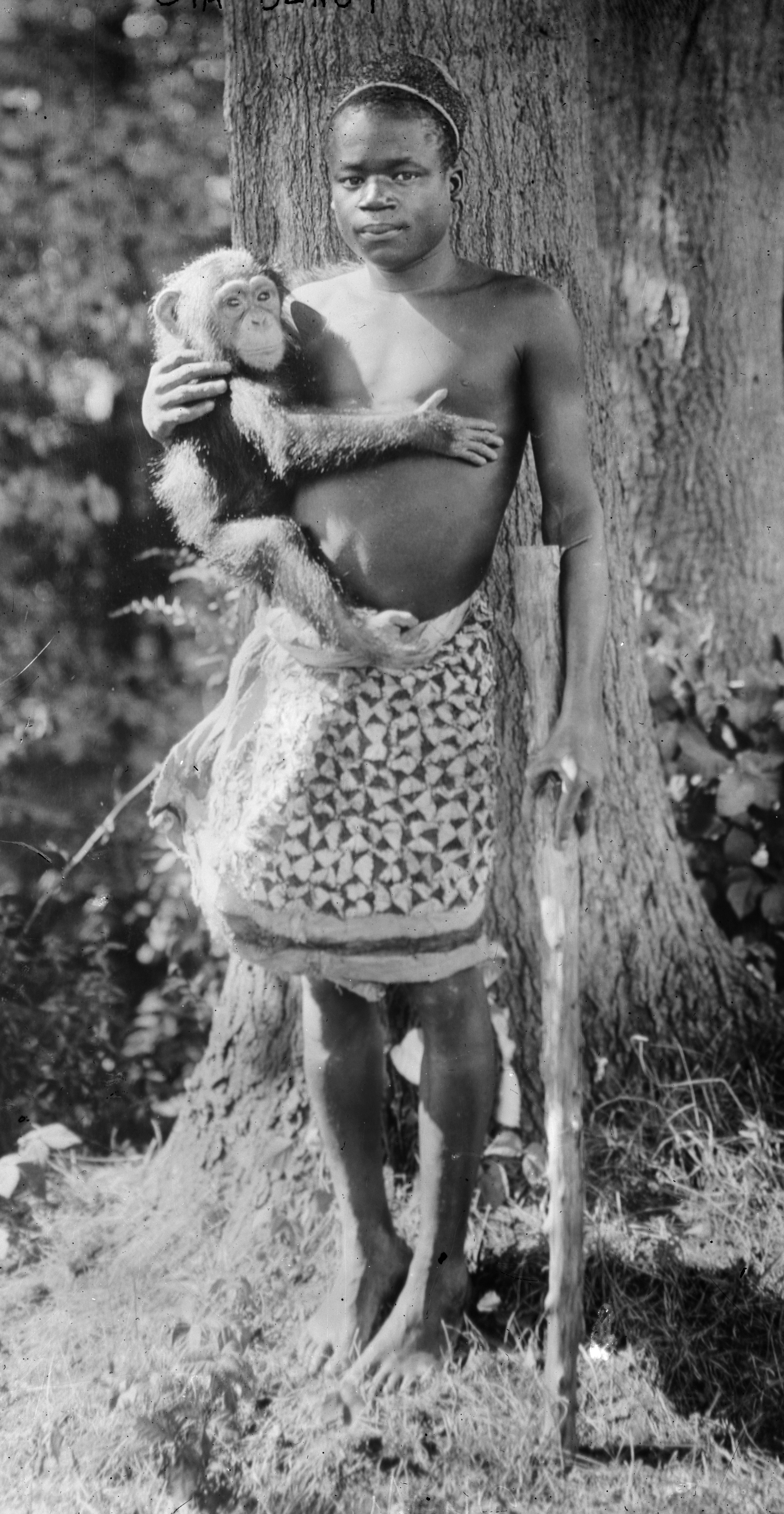
Ota Benga at the Bronx Zoo in 1906

==== Discrimination ====
Historically, pygmies have always been viewed as inferior by both colonial authorities and the village-dwelling Bantu tribes. Pygmy children were sometimes captured during the period of the Congo Free State, which exported Pygmy children to zoos throughout Europe, including the world's fair in the United States in 1907. Pygmies are often evicted from their land and given the lowest paying jobs. At a state level, Pygmies are sometimes not considered citizens and are refused identity cards, deeds to land, health care and proper schooling. The Lancet published a review showing that Pygmy populations often had worse access to health care than neighboring communities.

== Asia and Pacific ==
=== Southeast Asia ===
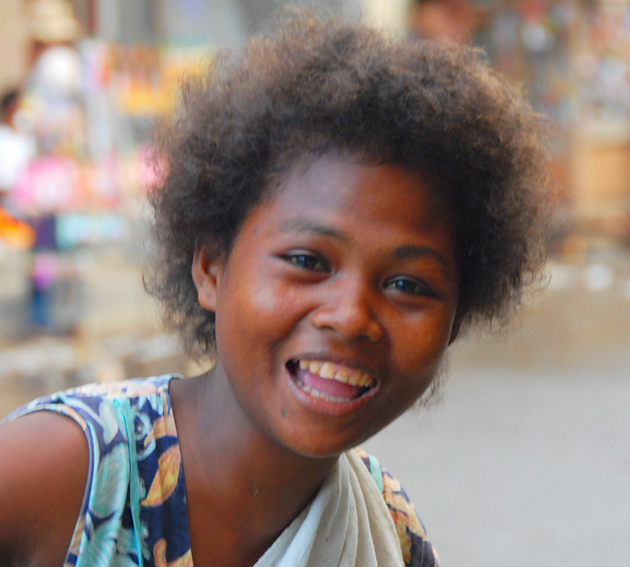
Ati woman of the Philippines

Negritos in Southeast Asia (including the Batak and Aeta of the Philippines, the Andamanese of the Andaman Islands, and the Semang of the Malay Peninsula) are sometimes called pygmies (especially in older literature). Negritos share some common physical features with African pygmy populations, including short stature and dark skin. The name "Negrito", from the Spanish adjective meaning "small black person", was given by early explorers. The explorers who named the Negritos assumed the Andamanese they encountered were from Africa. Their superficial resemblance to some Africans and Melanesians is thought to be from living in a similar environment, or simply retentions of the initial human form.

Their origin and the route of their migration to Asia is a matter of great speculation. They are genetically distant from Africans and have been shown to have separated early from Asians, suggesting that they are either surviving descendants of settlers from the early out-of-Africa migration of the Great Coastal Migration of the Proto-Australoids, or that they are descendants of one of the founder populations of modern humans.

Frank Kingdon-Ward in the early 20th century reported a tribe of pygmy Tibeto-Burman speakers known as the Taron inhabiting the remote region of Mt. Hkakabo Razi in Southeast Asia on the border of China (Yunnan and Tibet), Burma, and India. A Burmese survey done in the 1960s reported a mean height of an adult male Taron at 1.43 metres (4 feet 8 inches) and that of females at 1.40 metres (4 feet 7 inches). These are the only known "pygmies" of clearly East Asian descent.

The cause of their diminutive size is unknown, but diet and endogamous marriage practices have been cited. The population of Taron pygmies has been steadily shrinking and is now down to only a few individuals. In 2013, a link between the Taron and the Derung people in Yunnan, China, was uncovered by Richard D. Fisher, which may indicate the presence of pygmy populations among the Derung tribe.

=== Disputed presence in Australia ===
Australian anthropologist Norman Tindale and American anthropologist Joseph Birdsell suggested there were 12 Negrito-like tribes of short-statured Aboriginal peoples living on the coastal and rainforest areas around Cairns on the lands of the Mbabaram people and Djabugay people. Birdsell found that the average adult male height of Aboriginal people in this region was significantly less than that of other Aboriginal Australian groups; however, it was still greater than the maximum height for classification as a pygmy people, so the term pygmy may be considered a misnomer. He called this short-statured group Barrineans, after Lake Barrine.

Aboriginal encampment in rainforest behind Cairns, 1890. This is the photograph (attributed to A. Atkinson) found by Norman Tindale in 1938, which sent him and Joseph Birdsell in search of the people depicted. He identified the location by the wild banana leaves on the roof of the hut.

Birdsell classified Aboriginal Australians into three major groups, mixed together to varying degrees: the Carpentarians, best represented in Arnhem Land; the Murrayans, centred in southeastern Australia; and the Barrineans. He argued that people related to Oceanic Negritos were the first arrivals, and had been absorbed or replaced over time by later incoming peoples; the present-day Barrineans retained the greatest proportion of ancestry from this original Negrito group, "[b]ut this is not to say that the Barrineans are Negritos ... the Negritic component is clearly subordinate, and ... the preponderant element is Murrayian." This trihybrid model is generally considered defunct today; craniometric, genetic, and linguistic evidence does not support a separate origin of Barrinean or other Aboriginal groups, and physical differences between Aboriginal groups can be explained by adaptation to differing environments.

In 2002, the purported existence of short-statured people in Queensland was brought into the public eye by Keith Windschuttle and Tim Gillin in an article published by the right-wing Quadrant magazine (edited by Windschuttle himself). The authors argued that these people were evidence for a distinct Negrito population in support of Birdsell's theory, and claimed that "the fact that the Australian pygmies have been so thoroughly expunged from public memory suggests an indecent concurrence between scholarly and political interests", because evidence of descent from earlier or later waves of origin could lead to conflicting claims of priority by Aboriginal people and hence pose a threat to political co-operation among them. This and other publications promoting the trihybrid model drew several responses, which went over the current scientific evidence against the theory, and suggested that attempts to revive the theory were motivated by an agenda of undermining Aboriginal and Torres Strait Islander claims to native title.

Some Aboriginal oral histories and oral traditions from Queensland tell of "little red men". In 1957 a member of the Jinibara (the Dalla people) tribe of SE Queensland, Gaiarbau, who was born in 1873 and had lived for many years traditionally with his tribe, said that he knew of the "existence of these "little people – the Dinderi", also known as "Dimbilum", "Danagalalangur" and "Kandju". Gaiarbau claims he saw members of a "tribe of small people ... and said they were like dwarfs ... and ... not ... any of them stood five feet [1.5m]." The Dinderi are also recorded in other stories, such as one concerning a platypus myth and another, The Dinderi and Gujum - The Legend of the Stones of the Mary River.

Susan McIntyre-Tamwoy, archaeologist and adjunct professor at James Cook University, has written of the northern Cape York Aboriginal people's belief of the bipotaim, which is when "the landscape as we know it today was created". Bipotaim was formed "before people, although not perhaps before the short people or the red devils as these were also here before people". She writes, "many ethnographers recorded stories of 'short people' or what they referred to as 'pygmy tribes'", such as Lindsey Page Winterbotham. She used information collected both through oral accounts (including those of Injinoo people), observation and archival research. McIntyre-Tamwoy recounts a bipotaim story: "We are the short people [pygmies?]. Red devils occupy parts of the adjacent stony coast but our home is here in the sand dunes and forest. Before the Marakai ['white people'] came to our land the people were plentiful and they roamed the land. They understood the land and called out in the language of the country to seek permission, as they should ...".

According to Nathan Sentance, a librarian from the indigenous Wiradjuri nation employed by the Australian National Museum, there is no known archaeological or biological evidence such a people existed. Sentance claims it is a myth used to justify the colonisation of Australia as well as other countries by Europeans.

=== Micronesia and Melanesia ===
Norman Gabel mentions that rumours exist of pygmy people in the interior mountains of Viti Levu in Fiji, but explains he had no evidence of their existence as of 2012. E. W. Gifford reiterated Gabel's statement in 2014 and claims that tribes of pygmies in the closest proximity to Fiji would most likely be found in Vanuatu.

In 2008, the remains of at least 25 miniature humans, who lived between 1,000 and 3,000 years ago, were found on the islands of Palau in Micronesia.

During the 1900s, when Vanuatu was known as New Hebrides, sizable pygmy tribes were first reported throughout northeastern Santo. It is likely that they are not limited to this region of New Hebrides. Nonetheless, there is no anthropological evidence linking pygmies to other islands of Vanuatu.

== Archaic humans ==
The extinct archaic human species Homo luzonensis has been classified as a pygmy group. The remains used to identify Homo luzonensis were discovered in Luzon, the Philippines, in 2007, and were designated as a species in 2019. Homo floresiensis, another archaic human from the island of Flores in Indonesia, stood around 1.1 metres (3 feet 7 inches) tall. The pygmy phenotype evolved as a result of island syndrome which, amongst other things, results in reduced body size in insular humans.

== See also ==
- Bwiti
- Koro-pok-guru, small people in Ainu folklore
- Ota Benga, man taken as slave and zoo exhibit to the U.S.
- Vazimba, possible first inhabitants of Madagascar
- Homo floresiensis, an extinct species of short humans
- Island syndrome, the set of conditions which develop in island-dwelling organisms, including the pygmy phenotype in human people
- Dwarfs and pygmies in ancient Egypt

== Bibliography ==
- "Pygmy". The American Heritage Dictionary of the English Language. HarperCollins Publishers. 2022.
- "African Pygmies". 7 February 2016. Archived from the original on 7 February 2016.
- Aimard, Pierre-Laurent; Ligeti, György; Reich, Steve; Arom, Simha; Schomann, Stefan (2003). African Rhythms (Liner notes). Music by Aka Pygmies, performed by Aka Pygmies, György Ligeti and Steve Reich, performed by Pierre-Laurent Aimard. Teldec Classics. 8573 86584-2.
- Aristotle. History of Animals. Translated by D'Arcy Wentworth Thompson. 8.12, 892a12.
- Astill, James (8 January 2003). "Congo rebels are eating pygmies, UN says". The Guardian. Archived from the original on 29 March 2017.
- Baeckens, Simon; Van Damme, Raoul (20 April 2020). "The island syndrome". Current Biology. 30 (8): R329–R339. Bibcode:2020CBio...30.R338B. doi:10.1016/j.cub.2020.03.029. PMID 32315628.
- Bahuchet, Serge (1993). Hladik, C. M. (ed.). "History of the inhabitants of the central African rain forest: perspectives from comparative linguistics". Tropical forests, people, and food: Biocultural interactions and applications to development. Paris: Unesco/Parthenon. ISBN 1-85070-380-9.
- "DR Congo Pygmies appeal to UN". BBC News. 23 May 2003. Archived from the original on 13 December 2010.
- Beaumont, Peter (22 July 2019). "Gorillas, charcoal and the fight for survival in Congo's rainforest". The Guardian. Defenders: Saving Congo's Parks. Photos by Kate Holt – via theguardian.org.
- Becker, Rachel A. (28 July 2015). "We May Have Been Wrong About How African Pygmies Grow". National Geographic News. Archived from the original on 29 July 2015.
- Becker, Noémie S.A.; Verdu, Paul; Froment, Alain; Le Bomin, Sylvie; Pagezy, Hélène; Bahuchet, Serge; et al. (2011). "Indirect evidence for the genetic determination of short stature in African Pygmies" (PDF). American Journal of Physical Anthropology. 145 (3): 390–401. Bibcode:2011AJPA..145..390B. doi:10.1002/ajpa.21512. hdl:2027.42/86961. PMID 21541921.
- Lee R. Berger; Steven E. Churchill; Bonita De Klerk; Rhonda L. Quinn (March 2008). "Small-Bodied Humans from Palau, Micronesia". PLoS ONE. 3 (3) e1780. Bibcode:2008PLoSO...3.1780B. doi:10.1371/journal.pone.0001780. PMC 2268239. PMID 18347737.
- Birdsell, Joseph (1967). "Preliminary Data on the Trihybrid Origin of the Australian Aborigines". Archaeology & Physical Anthropology in Oceania. 2 (2).
- Blench, Roger (1999). "Are the African Pygmies an ethnographic fiction". In Biesbrouck, Karen; Elders, Stefan; Rossel, Gerda (eds.). Central African hunter-gatherers in a multi-disciplinary perspective: Challenging elusiveness (PDF). CNWS Leiden University. pp. 41–60. Archived from the original (PDF) on 20 April 2015 – via Roger Blench Website.
- Blench, Roger M.; Dendo, Mallam (27 June 2004). "Genetics and linguistics in sub-Saharan Africa" (PDF). Cambridge-Bergen: SAFA 2004. Archived from the original (PDF) on 21 July 2011 – via Roger Blench Website.
- Bozzola, M; Travaglino, P; Marziliano, N; Meazza, C; Pagani, S; Grasso, M; et al. (November 2009). "The shortness of Pygmies is associated with severe under-expression of the growth hormone receptor". Mol Genet Metab. 98 (3): 310–3. doi:10.1016/j.ymgme.2009.05.009. PMID 19541519.
- "Pygmy". Encyclopædia Britannica Online. 2007. Archived from the original on 28 March 2007.
- Cavalli-Sforza, Luigi Luca (1986). African pygmies. Academic Press. ISBN 978-0-12-164480-2.
- Clowes, William (11 July 2017). "Displaced Congolese civilians sent back to a widening war". irinnews.com.
- Collins, Beverley; Mees, Inger M. (2003) [First published 1981]. The Phonetics of English and Dutch (5th ed.). Leiden: Brill Publishers. ISBN 9004103406.
- Dávila N, Shea BT, Omoto K, Mercado M, Misawa S, Baumann G (March 2002). "Growth hormone binding protein, insulin-like growth factor-I and short stature in two pygmy populations from the Philippines". J Pediatr Endocrinol Metab. 15 (3): 269–276. doi:10.1515/JPEM.2002.15.3.269. PMID 11924928. S2CID 30556010.
- Dembner, S. A. (ed.). "Forest peoples in the central African rain forest: focus on the pygmies". FAO Corporate Document Repository. Food and Agriculture Organization Forestry Department. Archived from the original on 25 October 2016.
- Dixon, R. M. W. (1980). The Languages of Australia. Cambridge University Press. p. 262. ISBN 978-0-521-29450-8.
- Chisholm, Hugh, ed. (1911). "Wochua" . Encyclopædia Britannica. Vol. 28 (11th ed.). Cambridge University Press. p. 767.
- Fisher, Richard D. (n.d.). "The search for 'Dawi': the last of the T'rung pygmies of Burma and his return visit to his ancestral homeland in Tibet/Yunnan borderlands". Grand Canyons of the Earth. Archived from the original on 8 September 2013.
- Norman E. Gabel. A Racial Study of the Fijians.
- Gettleman, Jeffrey (30 April 2016). "In Congo, Wars Are Small and Chaos Is Endless". The New York Times. Archived from the original on 6 May 2017.
- E. W. Gifford. "Anthropological problems in Fiji".
- Gilligan, Ian; Bulbeck, David (2007). "Environment and morphology in Australian Aborigines: A re-analysis of the Birdsell database". American Journal of Physical Anthropology. 134 (1): 75–91. Bibcode:2007AJPA..134...75G. doi:10.1002/ajpa.20640. PMID 17568440.
- Groves, Colin (June 2002). "Australia for the Australians". Australian Humanities Review (26). Archived from the original on 15 January 2009.
- Hemedi, Patrick Saidi (16 November 2022). "After 14 years of advocacy, the DRC president finally signs new Indigenous peoples law (commentary)". Mongabay.
- Hewlett, Barry S. (1996). "Cultural diversity among African pygmies". In Kent, Susan (ed.). Cultural Diversity Among Twentieth-Century Foragers. Cambridge University Press. Archived from the original on 9 June 2010.
- Hiscock, Peter (2005). "The extinction of rigour: a comment on 'The extinction of the Australian Pygmies' by Keith Windschuttle and Tim Gillin". Aboriginal History. 29: 142–148. JSTOR 24046693.
- "DR Congo: Ethnic Militias Attack Civilians in Katanga". Human Rights Watch. 11 August 2015. Archived from the original on 8 March 2017.
- "Stricken by communal violence and malnutrition in Tanganyika, Democratic Republic of the Congo". International Committee of the Red Cross. 29 December 2017.
- Kashyap, VK; Sitalaximi, T; Sarkar, BN; Trivedi, R (2003). "Molecular relatedness of the aboriginal groups of Andaman and Nicobar Islands with similar ethnic populations" (PDF). The International Journal of Human Genetics. 3: 5–11. doi:10.1080/09723757.2003.11885820. S2CID 31992842. Archived (PDF) from the original on 27 March 2009.
- Klieger, P. Christiaan (Fall 2003). "Along the Salt Road". California Wild. Photos by Dong Lin. California Academy of Sciences. Archived from the original on 26 January 2021.
- Klieger, P. Christiaan (2005). "A Journey Through Northern Burma: Along the Salt Road". Woodland Travels. Photos by Dong Lin. Botahtaung Township, Myanmar. Archived from the original on 10 January 2009.
- Klieger, Christiaan. "Myanmar Anthropology – High Altitude Anthropology". California Academy of Sciences Science NOW: Where in the World. Photos by Dong Lin. Archived from the original on 2 December 2008.
- Klieman, Kairn A. (2003). The Pygmies Were Our Compass: Bantu and BaTwa in the History of West Central Africa, Early Times to c. 1900. Heinemann. ISBN 978-0-325-07105-3.
- Kristof, Nicholas D. (16 June 1997). "As the World Intrudes, Pygmies Feel Endangered". The New York Times. Archived from the original on 1 July 2017.
- LaPolla, Randy J.; Poa, Dory; GROS, Stéphane; Klieger, Christiaan. "Photos of Rawang People in the Hkakabo Razi Area". Rawang-Dulong-Anong Language and Culture. Photos by P. Christiaan Klieger and Dong Lin. Linguist List. Archived from the original on 12 February 2009.
- Larnach, Neil William George; Macintosh, S. L. (1970). The Craniology of the Aborigines of Queensland. University of Sydney. ISBN 0-85557-001-6.
- Leslie, Robert Murray (1911). "Pygmy" . Encyclopædia Britannica. Vol. 22 (11th ed.). pp. 677–679.
- Madan, Gaurav (22 July 2016). "India should follow China to find a way out of the woods on saving forest people". The Guardian.
- McAllister, Peter; Nagle, Nano; Mitchell, Robert John; et al. (1 June 2013). "The Australian Barrineans and Their Relationship to Southeast Asian Negritos: An Investigation using Mitochondrial Genomics". Human Biology. 85 (1): 485–94. doi:10.3378/027.085.0322. hdl:10072/57320. PMID 24297238. S2CID 33171899.
- McIntyre-Tamwoy, Susan (2000). Red devils and white men (Thesis). PhD thesis, James Cook University. doi:10.25903/db9w-9r36.
- McNiven, Ian J.; Russell, Lynette (2005). Appropriated Pasts: Indigenous Peoples and the Colonial Culture of Archaeology (2nd ed.). Lanham, Md.: AltaMira Press. pp. 90–92. ISBN 0-7591-0906-0.
- O'Dea, JD (January 1994). "Possible contribution of low ultraviolet light under the rainforest canopy to the small stature of Pygmies and Negritos". Homo: Journal of Comparative Human Biology. 44 (3): 284–7.
- O'Dea, Julian (21 December 2009). "Ultraviolet light levels in the rainforest". Archived from the original on 4 March 2016.
- Nyang'ori Ohenjo; Ruth Willis; Dorothy Jackson; Clive Nettleton; Kenneth Good; Benon Mugarura (2006). "Health of Indigenous people in Africa". The Lancet. 367 (9526): 1937–1946. doi:10.1016/S0140-6736(06)68849-1. PMID 16765763. S2CID 7976349.
- Olivero, Jesús; Fa, Julia E.; Farfán, Miguel A.; Lewis, Jerome; Hewlett, Barry; Breuer, Thomas; et al. (2016). "Distribution and Numbers of Pygmies in Central African Forests". PLOS ONE. 11 (1) e0144499. Bibcode:2016PLoSO..1144499O. doi:10.1371/journal.pone.0144499. PMC 4711706. PMID 26735953.
- "pygmy", Online Etymology Dictionary, archived from the original on 29 October 2013
- Patin, E.; Laval, G.; Barreiro, L. B.; Salas, A.; Semino, O.; Santachiara-Benerecetti, S.; et al. (2009). Di Rienzo, Anna (ed.). "Inferring the Demographic History of African Farmers and Pygmy Hunter–Gatherers Using a Multilocus Resequencing Data Set". PLOS Genetics. 5 (4) e1000448. doi:10.1371/journal.pgen.1000448. PMC 2661362. PMID 19360089.
- "Uganda's Batwa tribe, considered conservation refugees, see little government support". PBS. 21 October 2021.
- Peta, Basildon (9 January 2003). "Rebels 'eating Pygmies' as mass slaughter continues in Congo despite peace agreement". The Independent. Archived from the original on 26 December 2010.
- Quatrefages de Bréau, Armand de (1895). The Pygmies.
- "Aboriginal and Torres Strait Islander Health Service". Queensland Health. 30 October 2017.
- Rabinowitz, Alan (n.d.). Work on the Taron.
- Ross, Anne (June 2010). "Constant Resurrection: The Trihybrid Model and the Politicisation of Australian Archaeology". Australian Archaeology. 70 (1): 55–67. doi:10.1080/03122417.2010.11681911. JSTOR 27821565. S2CID 141126928.
- Rozzi, Fernando V. Ramirez; Koudou, Yves; Froment, Alain; Le Bouc, Yves; Botton, Jérémie (28 July 2015). "Growth pattern from birth to adulthood in African pygmies of known age". Nature Communications. 6 7672. Bibcode:2015NatCo...6.7672R. doi:10.1038/ncomms8672. PMC 4525207. PMID 26218408.
- Sample, Ian (12 March 2008). "Pygmy human remains found on rock islands". The Guardian. Archived from the original on 28 December 2016.
- Schulman, Susan (4 May 2016). "Life for the Baka Pygmies of Central African Republic". The Guardian. ISSN 0261-3077.
- "Dismantling the Australian pygmy people myth". The Australian Museum.
- Sheshadri, Raja James (December 2005). "Pygmies in the Congo Basin and Conflict". ICE Case Studies. American University. Archived from the original on 4 March 2016.
- Speiser, Felix (January 1996). Ethnology of Vanuatu: An Early Twentieth Century Study. University of Hawaii Press. p. 400. ISBN 978-0-8248-1874-6.
- Steele, John Gladstone (1983). Aboriginal Pathways: in Southeast Queensland and the Richmond River. Univ. of Queensland Press. ISBN 978-0-7022-5742-1.
- "Pygmies: Racism". Survival International. Archived from the original on 23 April 2015.
- Tishkoff, SA; Reed, FA; Friedlaender, FR; Ehret, C; Ranciaro, A; Froment, A; et al. (2009). "The Genetic Structure and History of Africans and African Americans". Science. 324 (5930): 1035–44. Bibcode:2009Sci...324.1035T. doi:10.1126/science.1172257. PMC 2947357. PMID 19407144.
- Thangaraj, Kumarasamy; et al. (21 January 2003). "Genetic Affinities of the Andaman Islanders, a Vanishing Human Population". Current Biology. 13 (2): 86–93(8). Bibcode:2003CBio...13...86T. doi:10.1016/S0960-9822(02)01336-2. PMID 12546781. S2CID 12155496.
- Thomas, Katie (12 March 2007). "Congo's Pygmies live as slaves". The News & Observer. Archived from the original on 28 February 2009.
- Tindale, Norman B. (16 December 2003) [Reproduced from N.B. Tindale's Aboriginal Tribes of Australia (1974)]. "Tjapukai (QLD)". Tindale's Catalogue of Australian Aboriginal Tribes. South Australian Museum. Archived from the original on 26 July 2008.
- Tindale, Norman Barnett (1974). "Tjapukai (QLD)". Aboriginal Tribes of Australia: Their Terrain, Environmental Controls, Distribution, Limits, and Proper Names. Canberra: ANU Press. ISBN 0-7081-0741-9. LCCN 75516991. OCLC 3052288. OL 4795942M. Wikidata Q128257949.
- "Congo: The tribe under threat". Unreported World. 2 June 2019. Archived from the original on 12 December 2021.
- VICE (21 May 2024). The Congolese Tribes Selling Weed to Survive | WEEDIQUETTE – via YouTube.
- Vidal, John (4 October 2007). "World Bank accused of razing Congo forests". The Guardian. Archived from the original on 13 May 2016.
- Vidal, John (26 November 2020). "'Large-scale human rights violations' taint Congo national park project". The Guardian.
- Warren, Tom; Baker, Katie (4 March 2019). "WWF Funds Guards Who Have Tortured And Killed People". BuzzFeed News.
- Westaway, Michael (13 March 2015). "Who we should recognise as First Australians in the constitution". The Conversation. The Conversation Media Group.
- Windschuttle, Keith (1 June 2002). "The extinction of the Australian pygmies". Quadrant magazine. Quadrant Magazine Ltd.
- Winterbotham, Lindsay P. (1957). "Gaiarbau's story of the Jinibara tribe of South East Queensland and its neighbours".
- Yew, Chee-Wei; Lu, Dongsheng; Deng, Lian; Wong, Lai-Ping; Ong, Rick Twee-Hee; Lu, Yan; et al. (2018). "Genomic structure of the native inhabitants of Peninsular Malaysia and North Borneo suggests complex human population history in Southeast Asia". Human Genetics. 137 (2): 161–173. doi:10.1007/s00439-018-1869-0. ISSN 1432-1203. PMID 29383489. S2CID 253969988.
- Yong, Ed (19 December 2007). "Short lives, short size – why are pygmies small?". Not Exactly Rocket Science. Archived from the original on 24 March 2012.
- Yong, Ed (5 May 2010). "Short lives, short size – why are pygmies small?". Discover Magazine.
