= Nu people =

Nu
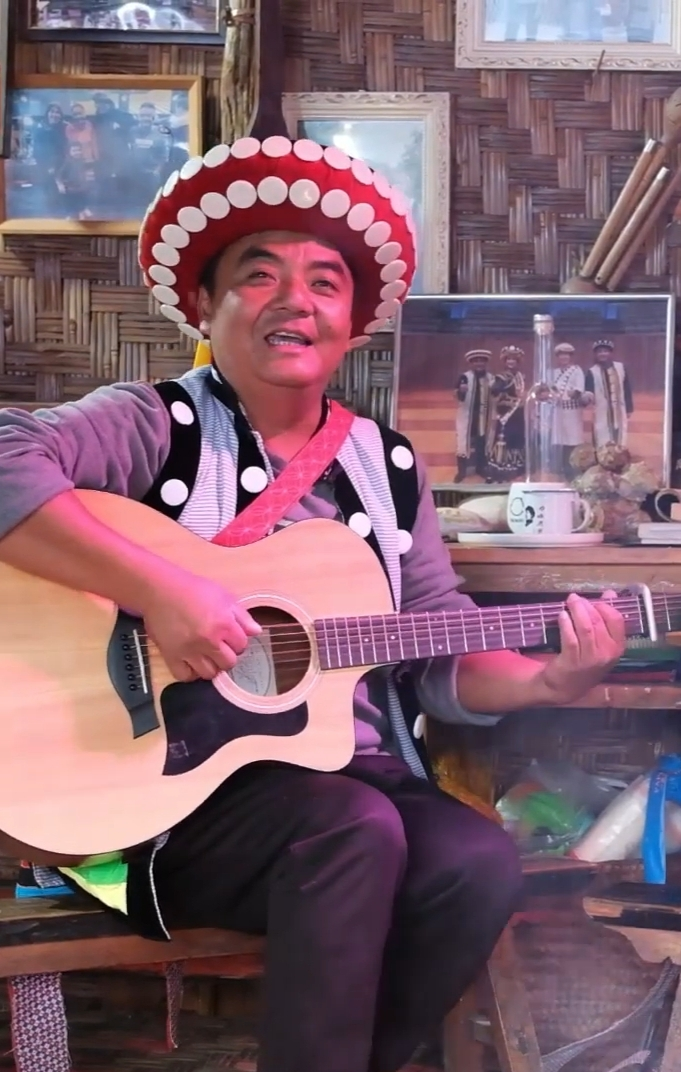
- A Nu man playing the guitar

Total population
- 36,575

Regions with significant populations
- Kachin (Myanmar). Yunnan (China): 36,575

Languages
- Nusu, Rouruo, Dulong, Nung (Anong), Rawang

Religion
- Most are Christian, Tibetan Buddhism, Animism

Related ethnic groups
- Lisu, Taron, Rawang, Derung, Tibetans

The Nu people (Chinese: 怒族; pinyin: Nùzú; lit. 'angry tribe'; alternative names include Nusu, Nung, Zauzou and Along) are one of the 56 ethnic groups recognized by the People's Republic of China. Their population of 36,575 is divided into the Northern, Central and Southern groups. Their homeland is a country of high mountains and deep ravines crossed by the Dulong, Irrawaddy (N'Mai River and Mali River), and Nujiang rivers. The name "Nu" comes from the fact that they were living near the Nujiang river, and the name of their ethnic group derives from there. (Nujiang is also called Nu river or Chinese: 怒江; pinyin: Nù Jiāng or Salween River.)

The Nu live mainly in Kachin State and Yunnan province. In China, 90% of them are found in Gongshan, Fugong and Lanping counties in Yunnan Province, along with Lisu, Drung, Tibetan, Nakhi, Bai and Han. There is also a sparse distribution of Nu in Weixi County in the Diqing Tibetan Autonomous Prefecture and Zayu County in Tibet Autonomous Region, particularly at the border between Yunnan and Tibet.

The Nu speak various languages in the Tibeto-Burman family. They do not have a written language of their own, although the Chinese government has helped them to develop a script based on the Latin alphabet.

== Dress ==
Linen clothes are popular among both genders. The womenfolk generally wore linen or cotton tunics with sleeves, which are buttoned on the left and long skirts. The young girls often wear aprons over their tunics. They like to wear necklaces strung with colored plastic beads. Some wear head or chest ornaments with strings of coral, agates, shells and silver coins. They wear big copper earrings that hang to the shoulder.

The menfolk often put on linen sleeved tunics over shorts, and almost every man wears a string of coral on his left ear and hangs a machete from the left side of his waist. When they go out, they often carry machetes, bows, and arrow bags made from animal felt. They wear black turbans wrapped around their head, though they tend to keep ear-length haircuts.

== Lifestyle ==
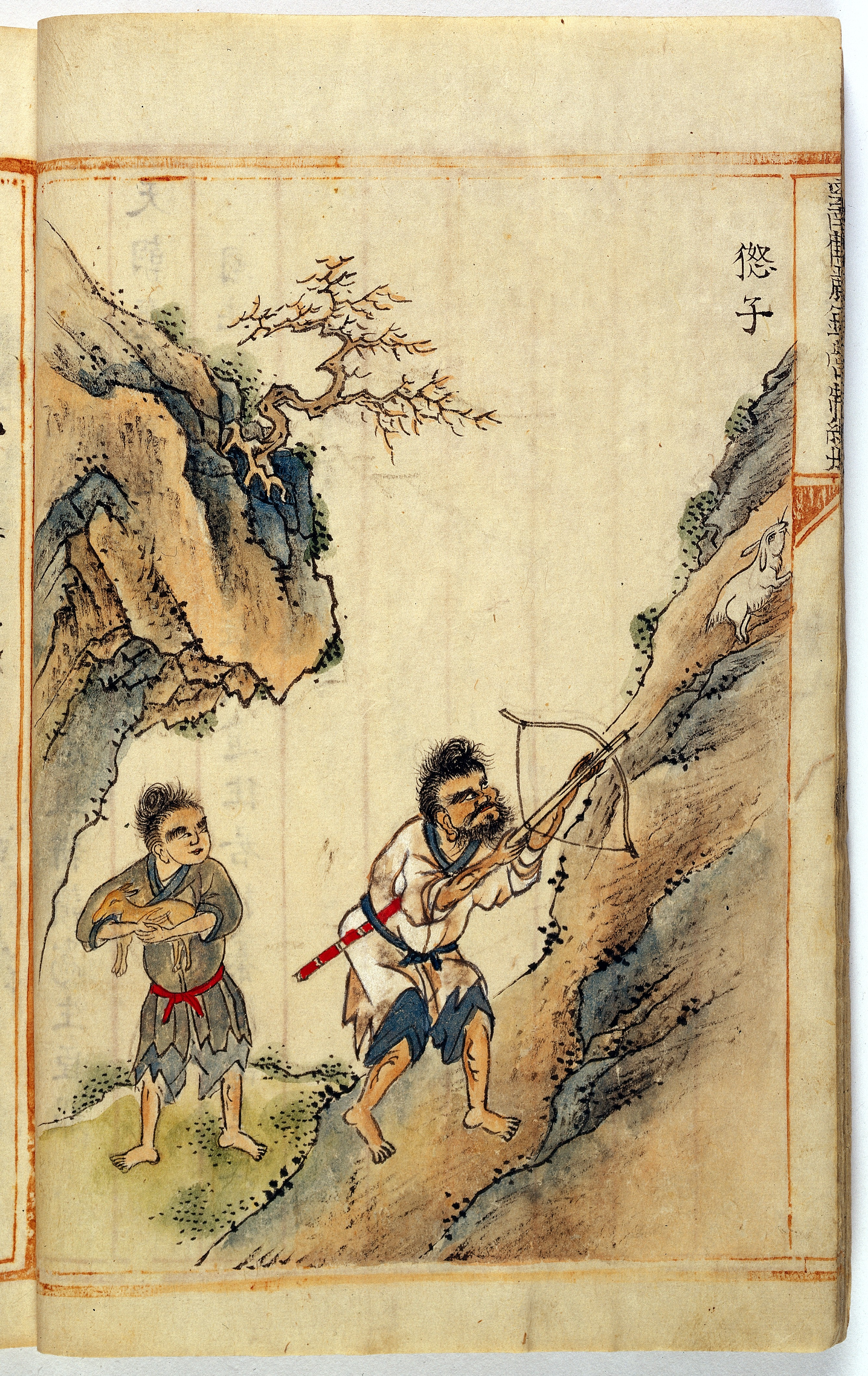
Nu people hunting

The Nu build their houses made out of either bamboo-slips or wooden planks near the mountains, though houses made out of the latter type are more prevalent due to its better strength. Within the house there are two stories; the lower floor acts as a barn, where livestock, food, and other storage items are placed, while the upper floor consists of the living quarters. On the second floor, it is further sub-divided into the inner and outer rooms. The inner room is used as a bedroom as well as a storeroom, while the outer one is as a kitchen and guestroom.

Agriculture is their main occupation. Bamboo and wooden farm tools were the tools for planting, and major crops include maize, buckwheat, barley, potatoes, yams and beans. Output is low, as chemical fertilizers are not used and primitive crop-planting techniques are used. The annual grain harvest is some 100 kg short of the per capita need, and the diet is supplemented by hunting and fishing.

== Religion and culture ==
The Nu are adherents of Tibetan Buddhism and their tribal Animism, which has close affinities with the natural world. A minority have converted to Christianity. Tibetan Buddhism is mainly professed by the Northern Nu. Most of the southern and central groups have retained their Animist faith, although Christianity has made some inroads into the southern group (through French missionaries in the second half of the 19th century).

The Nu celebrate the tribal flower-fairy festival, which is mainly celebrated by the Nu in the Gongshan area of Yunnan province. According to the Chinese lunar calendar, the festival comes on 15 March annually and lasts three days. The festival is based on the legend that the Nu River often flooded in ancient times. A Nu girl named A-Rong, inspired by the web of a spider, created a kind of rope-bridge, by which the people could cross the river. Coveting the beauty of A-Rong, the chief of the Hou tribe tried to force her to marry him time and time again. However, A-Rong would not agree, so she escaped into the mountains and eventually turned into a stone statue in a cave. To honor her, the Nu people celebrate Fairy Festival on March 15 every year.

Upon the arrival of the festival, the people will pick bunches of azaleas and sacrifice the fairy maiden at a cave, literally known as Fairy People Cave. After the ceremony, the people drink together at home, and people of all ages will dress up in their traditional costumes, holding fresh flowers. They will gather together in the open air, singing, dancing, and telling stories. Ball matches akin to football matches, bow and arrow competitions are held as well.

Another festival is the Jijilamu festival, the spring festival which lasts about 15 days from the end of lunar December to the beginning of lunar January. It is mainly celebrated by the Nu living in Bijiang, Fugong, Gongshan, Lanping and Weixi counties of Yunnan Province, although Losar is also celebrated by the Tibetan Buddhist Nu.

On the eve of the festival, households in every village butcher pigs, make soft-rice dumplings, brew wine and clean their courtyards, similar to the Chinese New Year. On New Year's Eve, before eating, they put corn and dishes of food on a three-legged barbecue. On top of the three legs, three cups are put and also three pieces of meat, then the family members, either young or old, pray for a good harvest and strong livestock for the New Year.
