= Nungish languages =

Language family

Nungish
- Geographic distribution: Yunnan Province of China, Burma
- Linguistic classification: Sino-Tibetan: Tibeto-Burman; Nungish
- Subdivisions: Trung; Anong; Rawang

Language codes
- Glottolog: nung1293

The Nung or Nungish languages are a poorly described family of uncertain affiliation within the Sino-Tibetan languages spoken in Yunnan, China and Burma. They include:

- Derung (Trung, Dulong, Drung, Tvrung)
- Rawang (Răwang, Rvwang)
- Nung (Anong, Along, Anung)

The Chinese name Ālóng 阿龙, sometimes misread Ayi, refers to Nung (Anong). Two other languages were formerly included under Nungish in the Ethnologue, namely Nor(r)a and Lama; however, they have recently been removed, as Nora is another name for the moribund Khamyang Tai language of Assam, and Lama (or Laemae) is a northern Bai variety that has been subsumed into the Lisu ethnic group in China.

== History of classification ==
Grierson (1928:24) tentatively put Nung (referring to the whole Nungish family, based on what was probably a Waqdamkong Rawang wordlist from J.T.O. Barnard) in the Lolo subgroup of Lolo-Mos'o, remarking, "The language appears to form a bridge between Lolo and Kachin".

Luo (2000:325 [1954]) placed Gongshan Qiu (Dulongjiang Dulong) and Gongshan Nu (Nujiang Dulong) in the Tibetan language branch (along with Tibetan, Jiarong, Qiang, and Xibo), but also stated that the person-marking in Qiu and Nu resembles that of languages in Nepal, and suggested that Qiu and Nu might form their own separate branch. Sun (1982:2) postulated a close relationship between Dulong, Jingpho, and Deng; elsewhere (2007:567) he limits this to Dulong and Jingpho. In a more extensive passage (1983:234-247), he still maintains that Dulong and Deng should be included in the Jingpho branch (1983:243), but also concludes that based on the unique characteristics of Dulong, it arguably deserve its own branch of Sino-Tibetan, but it has more similarities with Jingpho than with any other branch (1983:247). Nishida (1987) places Dulong and Nung (a supergroup including Rawang and Anong) together into a group called Lolo-Burmese-Dulong, alongside the Loloish and Burmese branches, but places Nu (Nusu?) directly under the Burmese branch.

In her PhD dissertation, Cui Xia (2009) compares Dulong with Tibetan, Qiangic (Pumi), Burmese-Yi (Zaiwa and Hani), and Jingpho, concluding that Dulong is on a separate branch. The results pertaining to Jingpho are summarized in Dai & Cui 2009.

Matisoff (various places, e.g. 2003:692) likewise postulated a relationship between Nungish and Jingpho, and a grouping called Jingpho-Nung-Luish, but neither van Driem (2001) nor LaPolla (2003) have been able to find substantiating evidence. Thurgood (2003) and LaPolla (2003) propose that Nungish may be part of a larger "Rung" group. Matisoff (2013) now agrees that the relationship between Nungish and Jingpho-Luish is due to contact, not a close genetic relationship. He also reiterates a relatively close relationship between Nungish and Lolo-Burmese, particularly the Burmish branch (Matisoff 2013:5). DeLancey (2009) includes Nungish in the Rung group along with rGyalrong, Qiang, Primi, and Tangut, and places Rung tentatively under Burmic, on the same level as Lolo-Burmese-Naxi.

Recently, LaPolla has proposed a group of features that are characteristic of Rawang (LaPolla 2012:126), and also offered a reconstruction of person-marking in Proto-Dulong-Rawang (LaPolla 2013:470).

Scott DeLancey (2015) suggests that Nungish may be part of a wider Central Tibeto-Burman group.

== Bibliography ==
- Cui Xia 崔霞. 2009. Dulongyu xishu bijiao yanjiu 独龙语系属比较研究 [A comparative study of Dulong]. Beijing: Zhongyang Minzu Daxue 中央民族大学 Central Minzu University PhD dissertation.
- Dai Qingxia 戴庆厦 & Cui Xia 崔霞. 2009. Cong Zangmianyu yufa yanbian cengci kan Dulongyu he Jingpoyu qinyuan guanxi de yuanjin 从藏缅语语法演变层次看独龙语和景颇语亲缘关系的远近 [The genetic distance between Dulong and Jingpo from the perspective of grammatical evolution of the Tibeto-Burman languages]. Zhongyang Minzu Daxue Xuebao (Zhexue shehui kexue ban) 《中央民族大学学报(哲学社会科学版)》 [Journal of the Central University for Nationalities (Philosophy and Social Sciences edition)] 2009(3). 132–139.
- DeLancey, Scott. 2009. Sino-Tibetan languages. In Bernard Comrie (ed.), The World’s Major Languages, 693–702. 2nd edition. London & New York: Routledge.
- van Driem, George. 2001. Languages of the Himalayas: an ethnolinguistic handbook of the greater Himalayan region. Brill.
- Grierson, George Abraham. 1928. Linguistic survey of India, vol. 1, pt. 2, Comparative vocabulary. Calcutta: Government of India Central Publication Branch.
- LaPolla, Randy J. 2003. Overview of Sino-Tibetan morphosyntax. In Graham Thurgood & Randy J. LaPolla (eds.), The Sino-Tibetan languages, 22–42. (Routledge Language Family Series). London & New York: Routledge.
- LaPolla, Randy J. 2012. Comments on methodology and evidence in Sino-Tibetan comparative linguistics. Language and Linguistics 13(1). 117–132.
- LaPolla, Randy J. 2013. Subgrouping in Tibeto-Burman: Can an individual-identifying standard be developed? How do we factor in the history of migrations and language contact? In Balthasar Bickel, Lenore A. Grenoble, David A. Peterson & Alan Timberlake (eds.), Language typology and historical contingency: In honor of Johanna Nichols, 463–474. Amsterdam & Philadelphia: John Benjamins.
- Luo Changpei 罗常培. 2000 [1954]. Guonei shaoshu minzu yuyan wenzi gaikuang 国内少数民族语言文字概况 [An overview of in-country minority languages and writing systems (in China)]. Zhongguo Yuwen 《中国语文》 [Chinese Language and Literature] 1954(3). Reprinted in Luo Changpei Wenji Bianweihui (ed.), The collected linguistic works of Luo Changpei, vol. 9 《罗常培文集(第9卷)》 Luo Changpei wenji (di jiu juan), 324–341. Jinan: Shandong Jiaoyu Chubanshe.
- Matisoff, James A. 2003. Handbook of Proto-Tibeto-Burman: system and philosophy of Sino-Tibetan reconstruction. Berkeley, Los Angeles, London: University of California Press.
- Matisoff, James A. 2013. Re-examining the genetic position of Jingpho: putting flesh on the bones of the Jingpho/Luish relationship. Linguistics of the Tibeto-Burman Area 36(2). 1–106.
- Nishida, Tatsuo. 1987. Dokuriugo oyobi Nugo no yiti ni tuite [On the position of the Trung and Nu languages]. Toohoogaku Ronshuu Fortieth Anniversary Volume. 988–973.
- Shintani, Tadahiko. 2018. The Khwingsang language. Linguistic survey of Tay cultural area, no. 113. Tokyo: Research Institute for Languages and Cultures of Asia and Africa (ILCAA).
- Shintani, Tadahiko. 2018. The Khrangkhu language. Linguistic survey of Tay cultural area, no. 114. Tokyo: Research Institute for Languages and Cultures of Asia and Africa (ILCAA).
- Sun, Hongkai 孙宏开. 1982. Dulongyu jianzhi 《独龙语简志》 [A sketch of the Dulong language]. (Guojia minwei minzu wenti wuzhong congshu 1). Beijing: Minzu Chubanshe.
- Sun, Hongkai 孙宏开. 1983. Liu jiang liuyu de minzu yuyan ji chi xishu fenlei 六江流域的民族语言及其系数分类 [Minority languages of the “six river valleys” and their respective classifications]. Minzu Xuebao 《民族学报》 1983(3). 99–274.
- Sun, Hongkai 孙宏开. 2007. Dulongyu 独龙语 [Dulong]. In Sun Hongkai 孙宏开, Hu Zengyi 胡增益 & Huang Xing 黄行 (eds.), Zhongguo de yuyan 《中国的语言》 [The languages of China], 567–580. Beijing: The Commercial Press 商务印书馆.
- Thurgood, Graham. 2003. A subgrouping of the Sino-Tibetan languages: The interaction between language contact, change, and inheritance. In Graham Thurgood and Randy J. LaPolla (eds.), The Sino-Tibetan languages, 3-21. (Routledge Language Family Series). London & New York: Routledge.
