= Derung people =

Sino-Tibetan ethnic group of Southwest China

Derung Trung, Dulong, Drung
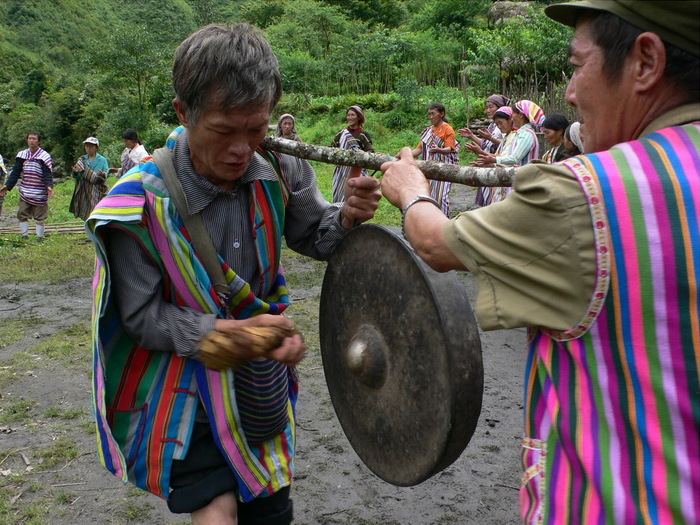
- A traditional Derung dance

Total population
- 7,310 (2020 census) (est.)

Regions with significant populations
- China: Yunnan

Languages
- Derung

Religion
- Animism, Christianity

Related ethnic groups
- Nu, Nung Rawang, Taron

The Derung people (simplified Chinese: 独龙族; traditional Chinese: 獨龍族; pinyin: Dúlóngzú, endonym: Drung pronunciation: [tə˧˩ɻuŋ˥˧ ə˧˩tsəŋ˥˧]), also spelt Drung or Dulong, are an ethnic group. They form one of the 56 ethnic groups officially recognized by China. Their population of 7,310 is found in the Nujiang Lisu Autonomous Prefecture of Yunnan in the Derung Valley of Gongshan Derung and Nu Autonomous County. Another 600 can be found east of the Derung Valley, living in the mountains above the Nu River (Salween River) near the village of Binzhongluo in northern Gongshan Derung and Nu Autonomous County.

== Language ==
The Derung speak the Derung language, one of the Sino-Tibetan languages. Their language is unwritten; in the past the Derung have transmitted messages and have made records by making notches on wooden logs.

== History ==
There are few documents about the origins of the Derung. It is known, nevertheless, that during the period of the Tang dynasty, the Derung were under the jurisdiction of Nanzhao and the Dali Kingdom. The Derung Valley area, the southernmost part of Tsawarong, was known by the Tibetans as Changyul or Kiongyul, meaning the "valley of beer" because Derung people enjoy drinking. From the Yuan dynasty to the Qing dynasty, the Derung were governed by the local Tibetan or Nakhi rulers. They also paid yearly tribute to China; the local Lama, called Changputong, was in charge of sending it to Weixi. In 1913, the Derung helped to repel a British attack in the area. Prior to 1949, there were several other names used for this ethnic group; they were known as Qiao during the Yuan and Qiu and Qu during the Qing.

== Culture ==
Prior to the formation of the People's Republic of China, Derung society was based on a system of patriarchal clans. A total of 15 clans existed, called nile; each one of them was formed by diverse familiar communities. Each clan divided itself into ke'eng, towns in which the Derung lived in common houses. Marriages between clans were prohibited.

The typical dress of the women consists of a dress made of fabric lined with colors black and white. Formerly, the women used to tattoo their faces when they reached the age of twelve or thirteen. The tattoos of some women resembled masculine mustaches.

Houses are usually constructed out of wood. They are two stories in height; the second floor is designed as the living quarters for the family, whereas the first level serves as a barn and stable. When a male member of the family is married, a new section is added to the family's house where he and his new wife will live.

== Religion ==
Although some Derung have converted to Christianity, the vast majority continue to believe in their animist native religion. There is a belief that all creatures have their own souls. Usually, diverse sacrifices are made in order to calm down the malignant spirits. The role of the shaman is of great importance since they are the ones in charge of the rituals. During the celebrations of the Derung New Year, which is celebrated in the month of December of the lunar calendar, diverse animal sacrifices are celebrated to make an offering to the sky.

== Gallery ==
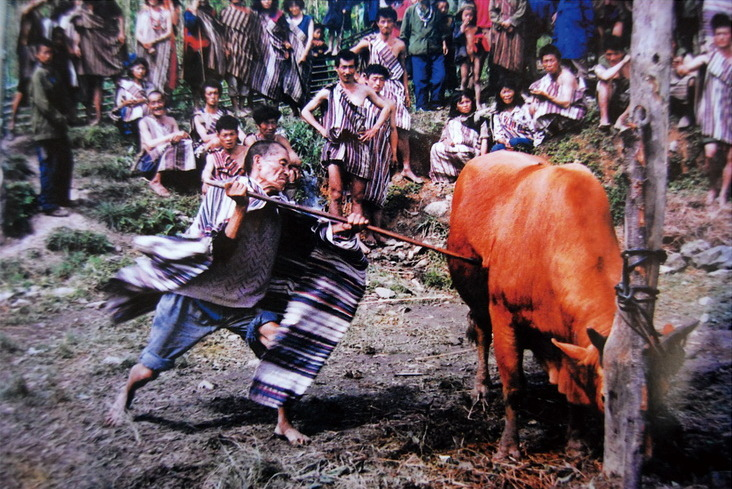
Animal sacrifice by Derung people in Gongshan Derung and Nu Autonomous County

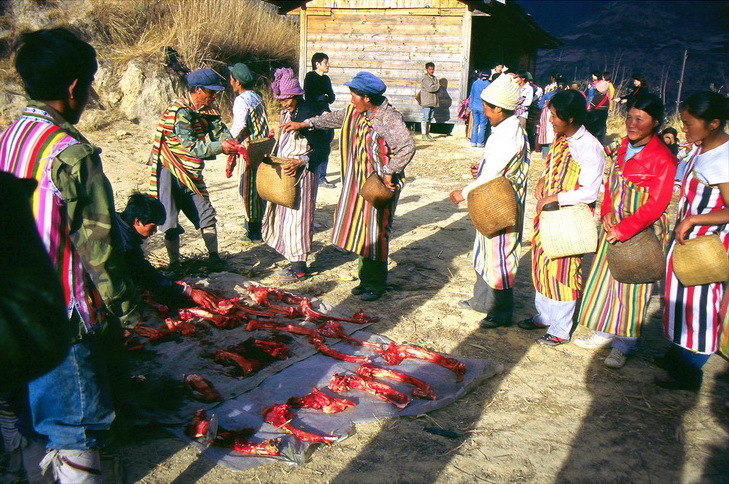
The meat is equally shared amongst the people

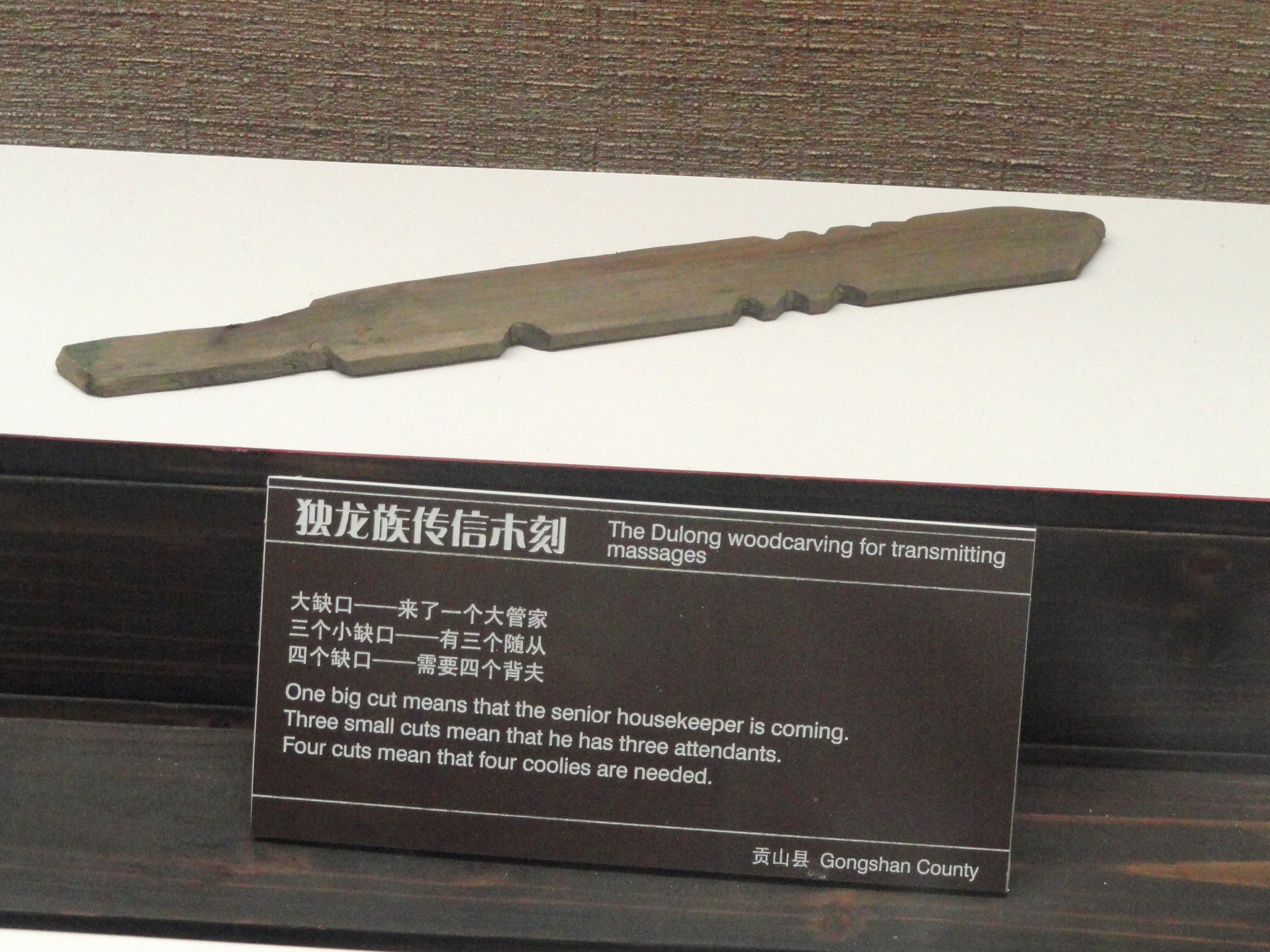
Derung message system on exhibit in the Yunnan Nationalities Museum

== See also ==
- Taron people
