= Nusu language =

Tibeto-Burman language of southwest China and northern Myanmar

Nusu
- Native to: China, Myanmar
- Ethnicity: Nu
- Native speakers: 13,000 (2007)
- Language family: Sino-Tibetan: (Tibeto-Burman); Lolo–Burmese; Loloish; Nusoish; Nusu

Language codes
- ISO 639-3: nuf
- Glottolog: nusu1239

The Nusu language is a Loloish language spoken by the Nu people of China and Myanmar. There are three dialects: Northern, Southern, and Central. The Central dialect of Miangu is the prestige dialect and is understood fairly well by speakers of other dialects.

Lama (2012) observes a sound change, *r- > Ø- from Proto-Loloish, as a Nusoish innovation.

== Distribution ==
The three Nusu dialects are spoken in the following locations (Nusuzu Nusuyu Jianzhi 怒族怒苏语简志 1986).

- Southern, also known as the Guoke-Puluo (果科-普洛) dialect: northern Lushui County 泸水县, in Guoke 果科, Puluo 普洛, Tongping 同坪, Jiajia 加甲 (3,000 speakers)
- Central, also known as the Zhizhiluo-Laomudeng (知之罗-老姆登) dialect: southern Fugong County 福贡县, in Pihe 匹河怒族乡, Zhizhiluo 知之罗, Laomudeng 老姆登, Miangu 棉古, Shawa 沙瓦, Zileng 子楞 (4,000 speakers)
- Northern, also known as the Wawa-Kongtong (瓦娃-空通) dialect: Fugong County 福贡县, in Wawa 瓦娃, Kongtong 空通, Youduoluo 有夺洛 (2,000 speakers)

The divergent Liangsu dialect (良苏话) is spoken in by about 3,000 people in the following locations of Fugong County, Yunnan.

- Zilijia Township 子里甲乡: Jianu 甲怒, Mazudi 马祖底, Jiada 甲打, Lamujia 腊母甲, Jiache 加车
- Jiakedi Township 架科底乡: Jiake 架科, La'anjia 腊安甲

== Phonology ==
=== Consonants ===
Consonants in Nusu
		Labial	Alveolar		Retroflex	(Alveolo-) Palatal	Velar	Glottal
		Labial	plain	sibilant	Retroflex	(Alveolo-) Palatal	Velar	Glottal
Nasal	voiced	m	n			ɲ	ŋ	
Nasal	unvoiced	m̥	n̥					
Stop/ Affricate	voiced	b	d	dz	ɖʐ	dʑ	ɡ	
Stop/ Affricate	unvoiced	p	t	ts	ʈʂ	tɕ	k	
Stop/ Affricate	aspirated	pʰ	tʰ	tsʰ	ʈʂʰ	tɕʰ	kʰ	
Fricative	unvoiced	f		s	ʂ	ɕ	x	h
Fricative	voiced	v		z	ʐ	ʑ	ɣ	
Approximant	voiced		l			j	w	
Approximant	unvoiced		l̥					

=== Tones ===
Nusu has seven tones:

Tone	IPA
High	˥
High falling	˥˧
Creaky low	˩ˀ
Low	˩
Creaky high	˥ˀ
Rising-falling	˨˦˨
Mid	˧
