= Rawang language =

Sino-Tibetan language

Rawang
- Rvwàng
- Native to: Myanmar, India, China
- Region: Kachin State (Myanmar), Arunachal Pradesh (India)
- Ethnicity: Rawang people
- Native speakers: 110,000 (2019)
- Language family: Sino-Tibetan: Tibeto-Burman; Nungish; Rawang
- Dialects: Mutwang (standard); Longmi; Serwang; Tangsarr; Daru
- Writing system: Latin (Rawang alphabet)

Language codes
- ISO 639-3: raw
- Glottolog: rawa1265

Rawang (Rvwàng) is a Sino-Tibetan language spoken primarily in northern Myanmar and northeast India. While Rawang displays a high degree of internal diversity—with some varieties being mutually intelligible only with difficulty—the Mutwang (Matwang) dialect is widely accepted as the standard for communication and the basis of the written language.

== Geographical Distribution ==
In Myanmar, Rawang is spoken in the Putao District of northern Kachin State, specifically within Putao, Machanbaw, Naungmaw, Kawnglangphu, and Pannandin townships. In India, speakers are found in the Vijaynagar circle of Changlang district, Arunachal Pradesh.

== Dialects and Intelligibility ==
Rawang is part of the Nungish branch, closely related to Drung and Anong. The dialect cluster exhibits varying degrees of lexical similarity:

- Mutwang-based dialects: Share 82% to 99% lexical similarity with each other.
- Distant dialects: Changgong Tangsar and Kyaikhu Lungmi show significantly lower mutual intelligibility with the Mutwang standard.
- Cross-language similarity: Rawang shares approximately 74% lexical similarity with Drung and 79%–80% with Anong.

== Morphology and Grammar ==
Rawang is an agglutinative language with a complex system of verbal morphology. It is a tonal language, typically featuring three main tones (high, mid, and low) which can change the meaning of a word entirely.

== Writing System ==
The Rawang language is written using a Latin-based alphabet developed in the mid-20th century. The orthography uses specific diacritics to mark tones (e.g., v̀ for low tone, v̄ for mid tone, and v́ for high tone). This script has been instrumental in the translation of the Bible and the publication of local literature, helping to unify the various dialect groups.

== Varieties ==
The Ethnologue lists the following varieties of Rawang.

- Daru-Jerwang (including the Kunglang variety spoken in Arunachal Pradesh)
- Khrangkhu/Thininglong (Southern Lungmi) (documented in Shintani 2018)
- Kyaikhu (Dangraq-Mashang, Northern Lungmi)
- Matwang
- Tangsar East (Changgong)
- Tangsar West (Langdaqgong, Renyinchi)
- Thaluq

Lungmi varieties of Mashang and Dangraq are especially divergent, and varieties spoken near the Tibetan border are also divergent.

Kyaikhu Lungmi and Changgong Tangsar are less intelligible with the standard written variety of Matwang.

There are 4 major Rawang clan divisions, in addition to subclans (Ethnologue):

- Lungmi
- Matwang
- Daru-Jerwang (consisting of Daru and Zørwang)
- Tangsar

Dvru (Daru) dialects include Malong, Konglang, Awiqwang, and Rvmøl. Tangsar is spoken to the east of Rvmøl, and Waqdamkong and Mvtwang to the south of Rvmøl. Rvmøl-speaking clans include Ticewang/Tisanwang/Ticvlwang/Chicvlwang, Abør, Chømgunggang, Chvngdvng, Dvngnólcv̀l/Dvngnóycv̀l, Dvlìnv̀m.

Wadamkhong is a Rawang dialect documented by Shintani (2014).

Straub (2017) provides demographic details and phoneme inventories for the following Rawang dialects.

- Dvrù dialect: spoken by the Rvwàng, Konglang, and Sangnay clans, and was originally spoken on the upper Rvmetì (N'mai Hka) river north of Konglangpø. It is also spoken in Nokmong, Putao District, Kachin State, Myanmar.
  - Rvmø̀l Rvwàng: a southern Dvrù dialect originally spoken north of Konglangpø, Putao District, Kachin State, Myanmar. It is geographically and linguistically transitional between the western Dvngsar, Waqdvmkong (northern Mvtwàng), and Dvrù dialects.
- Krvngku dialect: spoken in southern Lungmi, Rvwàng, from Rv́zà village (no longer existent since the mid-1960s). The village was located on the upper Krang stream, an eastern tributary of the Mvliq river in Kachin State, Myanmar.
- Western Dvngsar (Tangsar) dialect: spoken by the Mvpáng clan. It was originally spoken along the upper Renyinchi and Langdaqgong streams north of Konglangpø, Putao District, Kachin State, Myanmar.

Tadahiko Shintani has also documented the Wadamkhong, Khwingsang, Agu, and Dingra dialects.

== Phonology ==
=== Consonants ===
		Labial	Dental	Alveolar/ Retroflex	Palatal (-alveolar)	Velar	Glottal
Nasal		m	n̪			ŋ	
Plosive/ Affricate	voiceless	p	t̪	ts	tʃ	k	
Plosive/ Affricate	voiced	b	d̪	dz	dʒ	ɡ	
Fricative				s	ʃ		h
Liquid		w	l̪	ɽ	j		

- /w/ may be realized as [v] before front vowels.
- /b d̪ g/ are sometimes prenasalised [ᵐb ⁿd̪ ᵑg].

=== Vowels ===
	Front	Central	Back
Close	i	ɨ	u
Mid	e	ə	o
Open		a	

== Writing systems ==
In Myanmar, the Matwang dialect of Rawang has been romanised, while romanised Derung and Anung orthography systems exist in China.

== Bibliography ==
- Bradley, David (2002). "The Subgrouping of Tibeto-Burman". In Beckwith, Christopher I. (ed.). Brill's Tibetan studies library. 2,6: PIATS 2000: Tibetan studies: Leiden 2000 / ed. by Christopher I. Beckwith. Proceedings of the ... seminar of the International Association for Tibetan Studies. Leiden Köln: Brill. pp. 73–112. ISBN 978-90-04-12424-0.
- "Rawang". Ethnologue. 2021.
- LaPolla, Randy J. (2008). The Rawang Language. Linguistics of the Tibeto-Burman Area.
- Morse, Robert (1963). "The Rawang Syllabary". Anthropological Linguistics.
- Morse, Stephen A. (1988). "A short update on Rawang phonology". Linguistics of the Tibeto-Burman Area. 11 (2): 120–132.
- Shintani, Tadahiko (2014). The Wadamkhong language. Linguistic survey of Tay cultural area (LSTCA). Tokyo: Research Institute for Languages and Cultures of Asia and Africa (ILCAA).
- Shintani, Tadahiko (2018a). The Khrangkhu language. Linguistic survey of Tay cultural area. Tokyo: Research Institute for Languages and Cultures of Asia and Africa (ILCAA).
- Shintani, Tadahiko (2018b). The Khwingsang language. Linguistic survey of Tay cultural area. Tokyo: Research Institute for Languages and Cultures of Asia and Africa (ILCAA).
- Shintani, Tadahiko (2023a). The Agu language. Linguistic survey of Tay cultural area. Tokyo: Research Institute for Languages and Cultures of Asia and Africa (ILCAA).
- Shintani, Tadahiko (2023b). The Dingra language. Linguistic survey of Tay cultural area. Tokyo: Research Institute for Languages and Cultures of Asia and Africa (ILCAA).
- Straub, Nathan (2016). Direction and time reference in the Rvmøl (Dvru) dialect of Rawang, from northern Myanmar (M.A.). Chiang Mai: Payap University.
- Straub, Nathan (2017). "Numeral Systems of the World: Rawang dialects". Max Planck Institute for the Science of Human History. Archived from the original on 2018-07-19.
- Tournadre, Nicolas; Suzuki, Hiroyuki (2023). The Tibetic Languages: an introduction to the family of languages derived from Old Tibetan. Paris: LACITO. ISBN 978-2-490768-08-0.
