= Nung language (Sino-Tibetan) =

Sino-Tibetan language spoken in China and Myanmar

Anung
- Anong, Nung
- Anung
- Pronunciation: [ɑ˧˩ nuŋ˧˥]
- Native to: China, Myanmar
- Region: Fugong County
- Ethnicity: (Southern) Anung of Nu nationality
- Native speakers: (450 cited 2000–2007); 7,000 in China
- Language family: Sino-Tibetan: Nungish; Anung

Language codes
- ISO 639-3: nun – inclusive code Individual code: nrr – Nora
- Glottolog: nung1282
- ELP: Anong
- Nung is classified as Severely Endangered in Myanmar and Critically Endangered in China by the UNESCO Atlas of the World's Languages in Danger.

Southern Anung (autonym: [ɑ˧˩ nuŋ˧˥]; Chinese: 阿侬语; pinyin: Ānóngyǔ; (Note: Sometimes misread as Āyī 阿依) Lisu: Fuche Naw) is a Sino-Tibetan language spoken by the Nung people in Fugong County, China, and Kachin State, Myanmar. The Anung language is closely related to the Derung and Rawang languages. Most of the Anung speakers in China have shifted to Lisu, although the speakers are classified as Nu people. The Northern Anung people speak a dialect of Derung, which is also called Anung ([ə˧˩ nuŋ˥˧]), but is not the same Anung discussed in this article.

The Burmese and Chinese dialects of Anung have 87% lexical similarity with each other. Anung has 73-76% lexical similarity with Derung, and 77-83% lexical similarity with the Matwang dialect of Rawang.

== Demographics ==
Besides China and Myanmar, there are Anong people in Thailand and India.

=== China ===
Anong is spoken by over 7,000 people in China in the following townships.

- Shangpa (上帕镇): 2,200 people
- Lijia (里甲乡): 1,100 people
- Lumadeng (鹿马登乡): 2,100 people
- Lishadi (利沙底乡): 2,200 people

=== Myanmar ===
The majority of Anong speakers in Myanmar are found in Kachin State, specifically Myitkyina, Putao, Naungmun, Machanbaw, Tannai, and Khaunglangphu. There are over 5000 Naw (Anong) people in Kachin State, Myanmar.

- Putao: 2000 people
- Myitkyina: 3000 people
- Tanai: 500 people

In Myitkyina and Putao, there are literacy and language trainings every year.

Some Naw people live in Shan State, but it is not clear whether they still use Anong or not. There are also many living in cities such as Yangon, Khamti, and Taunggyi. Naw people are still mixed with the Lisu population.

== Phonology ==
=== Consonants ===
Nung has 43 single consonants.

		Labial	Alveolar	Retroflex	Palatal	Velar	Glottal
Nasal	voiceless	m̥	n̥	ɳ̥	ɲ̥	ŋ̊	
Nasal	voiced	m	n	ɳ	ɲ	ŋ	
Plosive	aspirated	pʰ	tʰ	ʈʰ		kʰ	
Plosive	tenuis	p	t	ʈ		k	ʔ
Plosive	voiced	b	d	ɖ		ɡ	
Affricate	aspirated		tsʰ	tʂʰ	tɕʰ		
Affricate	tenuis		ts	tʂ	tɕ		
Affricate	voiced		dz	dʐ	dʑ		
Fricative	voiceless	f	s	ʂ	ɕ	x	h
Fricative	voiced	v	z	ʐ	ʑ	ɣ	
Lateral	voiceless		l̥				
Lateral	voiced		l	ɭ			
Rhotic	voiced			ɹ			
