= Derung language =

Sino-Tibetan language of Southwest China

Drung
- Dulong, Derung, Qiuzu
- Tvrung kvt
- Pronunciation: [tə˧˩ɻuŋ˥˧ kət˥]
- Native to: China
- Region: Yunnan, Tibet
- Ethnicity: Anu (northern Anung) of Nu nationality Derung people
- Native speakers: (10,000 cited 2000–2013)
- Language family: Sino-Tibetan: Tibeto-Burman; Nungish; Drung
- Dialects: Dulong River; Nu River
- Writing system: Latin script

Language codes
- ISO 639-3: duu
- Glottolog: drun1238 Drung
- ELP: Drung

Dulong (simplified Chinese: 独龙语; traditional Chinese: 獨龍語; pinyin: Dúlóng) or Drung, Derung, Rawang, or Trung, is a Sino-Tibetan language in China. Dulong is closely related to the Rawang language of Myanmar (Burma). Although almost all ethnic Derung people speak the language to some degree, most are multilingual, also speaking Burmese, Lisu, and Mandarin Chinese except for a few very elderly people.

Dulong is also called: Taron, Kiu, Qui, Kiutze, Qiuzi, Kiupa, Kiao, Metu, Melam, Tamalu, Tukiumu, Qiu, Nung, Nu-tzŭ.

== Classification ==
Dulong belongs to the Nungish language family of the Central Tibeto-Burman branch of the Tibeto-Burman branch of the Sino-Tibetan language family. The other two languages in the same family are Anong and Rawang.

== History ==
Dulong/Rawang is a Tibeto-Burman language cluster spoken on both sides of the China/Myanmar border just south and east of Tibet. Within Myanmar, the people who speak the Dulong language (possibly up to 100,000 people) live in northern Kachin State, particularly along the Mae Hka ('Nmai Hka) and Mali Hka (Mali Hka) River valleys. In the past, they had been called 'Hkanung' or 'Nung', and have often been considered to be a subgroup of the Kachin (Jinghpaw). Around 1950, speakers of this language in Myanmar began a movement to use the name /rəwɑŋ/ (spelled 'Rvwang' in the Rawang orthographies) to represent all of its speakers. The speakers in China, though, continue to use the name 'Dulong'.

== Geographic distribution ==
There are 14,000 (2,000 census) people speaking in two dialects: 8,500 in Nu River dialect, and 5,500 in Dulong River dialect. The locations of Dulong are Yunnan province (Gongshan Dulong-Nu autonomous county), Xizang Autonomous Region (Chayu (Zayü) county, Chawalong Town), and Bingzhongluo. In the past, the Dulong River was known as the Kiu (Qiu) river, and the Dulong people were known as the Kiu (Qiu), Kiutze (Qiuzi), Kiupa, or Kiao.

=== Dialects ===
Dulong has two dialects: Dulong River (Central Dulongjiang, Derung River, Northern Dulongjiang, Southern Dulongjiang), and Nu River (Nujiang Dulong). Dialects reportedly inherently intelligible (Thurgood and LaPolla 2003). Other possible dialect names are Melam, Metu, Tamalu, and Tukiumu.

== Phonology ==
=== Consonants ===
Dulong has twenty-four initial consonants at six points of articulation, plus the consonant clusters /pr, br, mr, kr, xr, ɡr, pl, bl, ml, kl, ɡl/ in initial position; only the consonants /p, t, ʔ, k, n, m, ŋ, r, l/ occur in final position.

		Labial		Dental	Alveolar	(Alveolo-) palatal	Velar		Glottal
		plain	pal.	Dental	Alveolar	(Alveolo-) palatal	plain	labial	Glottal
Nasal		m	(mʲ)	n̪		ɲ	ŋ	ŋʷ	
Plosive	voiceless	p	pʲ	t̪		c	k	kʷ	(ʔ)
Plosive	voiced	b	bʲ	d̪		ɟ	ɡ	ɡʷ	
Affricate				t̪s̪		tɕ			
Fricative	voiceless			s̪		ɕ	x	xʷ	
Fricative	voiced			z̪		ʑ			
Approximant		w		l̪	ɹ	(j)			

- /ts tɕ/ are often aspirated [tsʰ tɕʰ], but the feature is not contrastive.
- /xʲ/ is a marginal phoneme in the Third Township dialect, corresponding to /ɕ/ elsewhere.
- /j/ appears in initial position only in the Fourth Township dialect, corresponding to /ɟ/ elsewhere.
- /f tsʷ sʷ tʷ lʷ tʲ lʲ/ are found in Chinese loanwords.
  - Standard Mandarin retroflex consonants /ʈʂ ʈʂʰ ʂ/ are borrowed as /z ts s/.

=== Vowels ===
Derung has seven monophthongs:

	Front		Central		Back	
	short	long	short	long	short	long
Close	i	(iː)	ɯ	(ɯː)	u	(uː)
Mid	ɛ	(ɛː)	ə		ɔ	(ɔː)
Open					ɑ	

- /ɯ/ is an unrounded back vowel.
- Vowel length does not have contrastive status in the lexicon, but it plays an important grammatical role.

Derung has four diphthongs /əi̯ ɑi̯ (ɑi̯) ɯi̯ (ɯi̯) ɔi̯ (ɔi̯)/, found only in open syllables; not all speakers contrast /ɯi̯ ɔi̯/.

=== Tones ===
Dulong has 3 tones: high level, high falling, and low falling. In the Dulong language, tone has the role of differentiating the meaning of a few words, with about 8% words (out of about 4000) completely relying on tones to distinguish them.

== Writing system ==
A Derung alphabet based on the Latin script was developed in 1983, but it is not widely used and is not officially recognized.

 Initials:

- B b (/b/)
- P p (/p/)
- M m (/m/)
- F f (/f/)
- W w (/w/)
- D d (/d/)
- T t (/t/)
- N n (/n/)
- L l (/l/)
- G g (/ɡ/)
- K k (/k/)
- Ng ng (/ŋ/)
- H h (/x/)
- J j (/ʥ/)
- Ch ch (/ʨ/)
- Ny ny (/ɲ/)
- Sh sh (/ɕ/)
- Y y (/j/)
- Z z (/ʣ/)
- C c (/ʦ/)
- S s (/s/)
- R r (/ɹ/)
- Q q (/ʔ/)
- By by (/bj/)
- Py py (/pj/)
- My my (/mj/)
- Gy gy (/ɡj/)
- Ky ky (/kj/)
- Hy hy (/xj/)
- Bl bl (/bl/)
- Pl pl (/pl/)
- Ml ml (/ml/)
- Gl gl (/ɡl/)
- Kl kl (/kl/)
- Br br (/bɹ/)
- Pr pr (/pɹ/)
- Mr mr (/mɹ/)
- Gr gr (/ɡɹ/)
- Kr kr (/kɹ/)
- Hr hr (/xɹ/)

 Finals:

- I i (/i/)
- E e (/ɛ/)
- A a (/ɑ/)
- V v (/ʌ/)
- O o (/ɔ/)
- U u (/u/)
- Eu eu (/ɯ/)
- Ei ei (/ɛi/)
- Ai ai (/ɑi/)
- Oi oi (/ɔi/)
- Ui ui (/ui/)
- Ua ua (/uɑ/)
- Ue ue (/uɛ/)
- Eui eui (/ɯi/)
- Uai uai (/uɑi/)

 /ʌ/ is written a at the beginning of word. Tones are unmarked. The letter X is not used, and the C is only used in the digraph Ch.

 The letter V is used as a vowel, not as a consonant.

== Grammar ==
Words can be formed by prefixation, suffixation, or compounding. Word classes include nouns, defined by the ability to appear with a numeral classifier; verbs, defined by the ability to appear with negation and the person and tense marking; postpositions, which are enclitic to NPs, numerals, and classifiers. Adjectives are a subset of stative verbs for which reduplication means intensification or adverbialization rather than the perfective aspect (reduplication with nouns has a distributive meaning, ‘every’). Adjectives can be used as predicates or can appear nominalized in a copula clause.

The grammar of the language is documented extensively by Perlin (2019).

=== Verb conjugation ===
Derung verbs inflect fusionally for person and number and agglutinatively otherwise. Verbal conjugation uses a mix of affixes, a direct-inverse person-marking hierarchy, apophony, and tone changes.

==== Intransitive verbs ====
Intransitive verbs are conjugated to agree with the subject in person and number.

The first-person plural form is formed via vowel ablaut, primarily characterized by the lengthening of the root vowel. If the root vowel is the schwa /ə/, the schwa is replaced with /ɑː/. If the root ends in /ɑ, u, ɯ/, these vowels are further converted into long diphthongs /ɑːi, uːi, ɯːi/.

Intransitive person/number affixes in Derung
Person	Singular	Dual	Plural
1st	-ŋ⁵⁵ (Note: If the verb root ends in a vowel.) -k⁵⁵ (Note: If the verb root ends in a glottal stop.) -⁵⁵ (Note: If the verb root ends in a consonant other than the glottal stop. If the root already has level tone, the first-person singular inflection becomes zero.)	-ɕɯ³¹	(ablaut)
2nd	-∅	-ɕɯ³¹	-n⁵³
3rd	-∅		

==== Transitive verbs ====
Transitive verbs in Derung may exhibit agreement with both their agent and their patient, and conjugate for three grammatical persons (1st, 2nd, and 3rd) and three grammatical numbers (singular, dual, and plural). However, the appearance of agreement is also governed by pragmatic factors.

The prefix /nə³¹/ (which Perlin calls a "marked scenario prefix") appears if one of the two following conditions is satisfied:

- The prefix always appears when a second-person agent is involved, regardless of hierarchy.
- The prefix also appears according to direct–inverse hierarchy of grammatical persons, in which /nə³¹/ serves as an inverse marker. First-person agents prevent the prefix from appearing (even with a second-person patient), and third-person agents, lying at the bottom of the hierarchy, take the prefix if the patient is not also in the third person.

On top of the "marked scenario prefix", Derung transitive conjugation shows extensive stem allomorphy. The principal stems can be listed as follows:

- The dual stem of the verb (D)
  - This stem is generally identical to the unmarked citation form of the verb, although Perlin is not consistent with which tone the dual stem assumes compared to the citation form (he for instance records /wɑ/ "to do" with a high-falling tone in the unmarked form but with a high level tone in the dual; but on the other hand /lɑ/ "to seek" has high falling tone in both the dual and unmarked forms).
  - Mainly appears when an argument to the verb is in the dual number.
- The 1st-person singular stem (1S)
  - Generally appears when a first-person singular argument is present.
  - Formed similarly to the first-person singular form of intransitive verbs. The first-person singular stem must always have high level tone, regardless of the tone of the dual stem. Vowel-final verbs additionally suffix -ŋ.
- The 1st-person plural stem (1P)
  - Characterized by ablaut of the verb root, in which the root vowel is replaced by a long vowel.
  - Used to form 1st-person plural (agent and patient) and 3rd-person patient conjugations.
  - Originally a merger of two separate stems ending in *-i (for the first-person plural) and *-u (for third-person patients). The vowel length in this stem originally came from compensatory lengthening as suffixed *-i and *-u were lost.
- The 2nd-person plural stem (2P)
  - Used primarily when there is a second-person plural argument.
  - On vowel-final verbs, this is formed by suffixing -n to the dual stem. If the dual stem already ends in a nasal, no suffix is appended. If the dual stem ends in a stop consonant, the stop is replaced by a nasal followed by a glottal stop.

The general conjugation of a transitive Derung verb is as follows:

Derung transitive verb conjugation
		Agent						
Patient ↓		First person			Second person			Third person
Patient ↓		Singular	Dual	Plural	Singular	Dual	Plural	Third person
First person	Singular	—			nə³¹-1S	nə³¹-1S-ɕɯ³¹	nə³¹-2P	nə³¹-1S
First person	Dual	—			nə³¹-D-ɕɯ³¹			
First person	Plural	—			nə³¹-1P	nə³¹-D-ɕɯ³¹	nə³¹-2P	nə³¹-1P
Second person	Singular	1S	D-ɕɯ³¹	1P	—			nə³¹-D
Second person	Dual	1S-ɕɯ³¹	D-ɕɯ³¹	1P	—			nə³¹-D-ɕɯ³¹
Second person	Plural	1P	D-ɕɯ³¹	1P	—			nə³¹-2P
Third person		1S (Note: If the verb root is vowel-final.); 2P (Note: If the verb root ends in a stop consonant.); D (Note: If the verb root ends in a nasal.)	D-ɕɯ³¹	1P	nə³¹-1P	nə³¹-D-ɕɯ³¹	nə³¹-2P	1P

==== Negation ====
Derung verbs are negated by prefixing mə³¹ (which also surfaces as an allomorph mɑ³¹). The negative prefix also contracts with the copula ɛ⁵³ to form mɛ⁵⁵, and also with əl⁵³ "to have" to form mɑl⁵³.

==== Tense, aspect, mood and evidentiality markers ====
Derung has an elaborate set of markers that normally follow a verb that mark tense–aspect–mood distinctions, as well as evidentiality and mirativity.

===== Mirativity and evidentiality =====
Derung has two separate markers that Perlin assigns "mirative" meaning, namely /ɹɑ³¹/ to mark directly witnessed events and /mɯ³¹/ to mark events that are deduced to have happened.

/tɕi³¹/ marks something that is customary or common knowledge, while /wɑ³¹/ marks something that the speaker heard from someone else.

== Vocabulary ==
Derung shares 74% lexical similarity with the Matwang dialect of Rawang, and 73% to 76% with Anong.

== Bibliography ==
- "Did you know Drung is vulnerable?". Endangered Languages.
- "Drung". Ethnologue (25th ed.).
- LaPolla, Randy J. (2000). "Valency-changing derivations in Dulong/Rawang" ( (PDF)). Changing Valency. pp. 282–311. doi:10.1017/CBO9780511627750.009. ISBN 9780521660396. Archived from the original on 2017-08-10.
- Perlin, Ross (April 2009). "Language Attitudes of the T'rung" (PDF). Linguistics of the Tibeto-Burman Area. 32 (1): 91–113. Archived from the original on February 28, 2017.
- Perlin, Ross (2019). "A Grammar of Trung". Himalayan Linguistics. 18 (2). doi:10.5070/H918244579.
- Sun, Hongkai (1982). Dúlóngyǔ jiǎnzhì (A sketch of the Dulong language). Beijing: Minzu Chubanshe.
- Thurgood, Graham; LaPolla, Randy J. (2003). The Sino-Tibetan languages. Abingdon, Oxon: Routledge. pp. 674–682. ISBN 0-203-27573-X.
- Zhou, Minglang (2003). Multilingualism in China: The Politics of Writing Reforms for Minority Languages. Berlin: Mouton de Gruyter.
