= Naga-Manipuri-Chin hills moist forests =

The Naga-Manipuri-Chin hills moist forests is an ecoregion of India, Bangladesh, and Myanmar, designated by the World Wide Fund for Nature as one of the world's outstanding Global 200 ecoregions.

The Global 200 ecoregion includes several ecoregions:

- Northern Triangle subtropical forests
- Mizoram–Manipur–Kachin rain forests
- Chin Hills–Arakan Yoma montane forests
- Meghalaya subtropical forests
- Northeast India–Myanmar pine forests
