= Brahmaputra Valley semi-evergreen forests =

Ecoregion of India and Bhutan

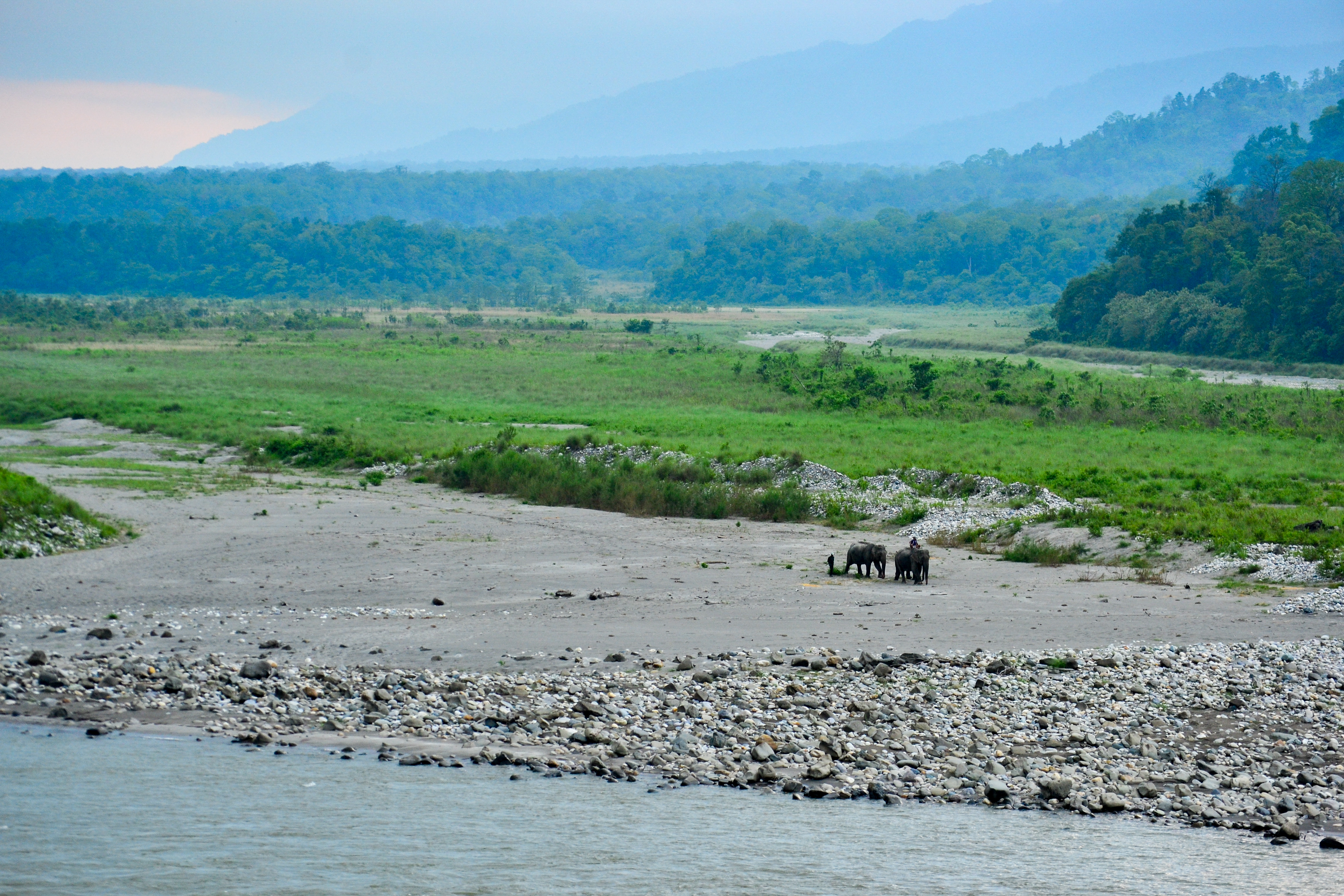
- Manas National Park

- Brahmaputra Valley Semi-Evergreen Forests outlined in purple

Ecology
- Realm: Indomalayan realm
- Biome: tropical and subtropical moist broadleaf forests
- Borders: List: Eastern Himalayan broadleaf forests; Himalayan subtropical broadleaf forests; Lower Gangetic Plains moist deciduous forests; Meghalaya subtropical forests; Mizoram–Manipur–Kachin rain forests
- Bird species: 370
- Mammal species: 122

Geography
- Area: 56,700 km^{2} (21,900 mi^{2})
- Countries: Bhutan; India; Bangladesh
- States: Assam; Arunachal Pradesh; Nagaland

Conservation
- Protected: 5%

The Brahmaputra Valley semi-evergreen forests is a subtropical moist broadleaf forest ecoregion of Northeastern India, southern Bhutan and adjacent Bangladesh.

== Location and description ==
The ecoregion covers 56,700 square kilometers (21,900 sq mi) and encompasses the alluvial plain of the upper Brahmaputra River as it moves westward through India's Assam state (with small parts of the ecoregion in the states of Arunachal Pradesh and Nagaland and also south Bhutan and northern Bangladesh). The valley lies between the Himalayas to the north and the Lushai hills to the south and when the river floods during the June to September monsoon it brings up to 300 cm of water onto the plain carrying rich soils to create a fertile environment which has been extensively farmed for thousands of years. Other rivers that water the plains as well as the Brahmaputra include the Manas and the Subansiri.

== Flora ==
The extensive farming has meant that the original semi-evergreen forest now exists only in patches. Typical canopy trees include the evergreen Syzygium, Cinnamomum and Magnoliaceae along with deciduous Terminalia myriocarpa, Terminalia citrina, Terminalia tomentosa, Bombax ceiba, Tetrameles species. Understory trees and shrubs include the laurels Phoebe, Machilus, and Actinodaphne, Polyalthias, Aphanamixis, and cultivated Mesua ferrea and species of mahogany, cashews, nutmegs and magnolias, with bamboos such as Bambusa arundinaria and Melocanna bambusoides.

== Fauna/animals ==
Despite the centuries of human clearance and exploitation, the forests and grasslands along the river remain a habitat for a variety of wildlife including tiger (Panthera tigris), clouded leopard (Pardofelis nebulosa), capped langur (Semnopithecus pileatus), gaur (Bos gaurus), barasingha deer (Cervus duvaucelii), sloth bear (Melursus ursinus), wild water buffalo (Bubalus arnee), India's largest population of Asian elephants (Elephas maximus) and the world's largest population of Indian rhinoceros, while Asian black bears live in the higher slopes of the valley sides. Most of these mammals are threatened or endangered species. The Brahmaputra is a natural barrier to the migration of much wildlife and many species, such as the pygmy hog, hispid hare, or the Malayan sun bear, pig-tailed macaque, golden langur, stump-tailed macaque, western hoolock gibbon live on one side of the river only. The area is a meeting point of species of Indian and Malayan origin. The endemic mammals of the valley are the pygmy hog and the hispid hare, both of which inhabit the grasslands of the riverbanks.

The valley is home to rich bird life with 370 species of which two are endemic, the Manipur bush quail (Perdicula manipurensis) and the marsh babbler (Pellorneum palustre) and one, the Bengal florican is very rare. Woodland birds like kalij pheasant, great hornbill, rufous necked hornbill, brown hornbill, Oriental pied hornbill, grey hornbill, peacock pheasant and tragopan are quite common.

== Threats and preservation ==
This area has been densely populated for centuries and most of the valley has been and still are used for agriculture. Some blocks of natural habitat do remain, however, mainly in national parks the largest of which are Manas, Dibru-Saikhowa and Kaziranga National Parks in India. In Bhutan, these areas are part of Royal Manas National Park.

=== Protected areas ===
In 1997, the World Wildlife Fund identified twelve protected areas in the ecoregion, with a combined area of approximately 2,560 km^{2}, that include 5% of the ecoregion's area.

- Dehing Patkai Landscape, including Dehing Patkai National Park and Dehing Patkai Elephant Reserve
- Mehao Wildlife Sanctuary, Arunachal Pradesh (190 km^{2}, also includes portions of the Eastern Himalayan broadleaf forests and Himalayan subtropical pine forests)
- Manas National Park, Assam (560 km^{2})
- Bornadi Wildlife Sanctuary, Assam (90 km^{2})
- Kaziranga National Park, Assam (320 km^{2})
- Orang National Park, Assam (110 km^{2})
- Laokhowa Wildlife Sanctuary, Assam (170 km^{2})
- Pobitora Wildlife Sanctuary, Assam (80 km^{2})
- Sonai Rupai Wildlife Sanctuary, Assam (160 km^{2})
- Nameri National Park, Assam (90 km^{2})
- Dibru-Saikhowa National Park, Assam (490 km^{2})
- D'Ering Memorial Wildlife Sanctuary, Arunachal Pradesh (190 km^{2})
- Pabha Wildlife Sanctuary, Assam (110 km^{2})

=== Vulture breeding ===
Rani Vulture Breeding Centre was established in 2008 inside Brahmaputra Valley semi-evergreen forests at Rani in Kamprup district with the help of Jatayu Conservation Breeding Centre, Pinjore, which now houses 90 vultures as of December 2018. 40 million vultures have died in last 20 years.

== See also ==
- List of ecoregions in Bhutan
- List of ecoregions in India
- Himalayan subtropical broadleaf forests
- Meghalaya subtropical forests
- Margalla Hills
- Mizoram–Manipur–Kachin rain forests
- Eastern Himalayan broadleaf forests
