= Chin Hills–Arakan Yoma montane forests =

Ecoregion in Myanmar

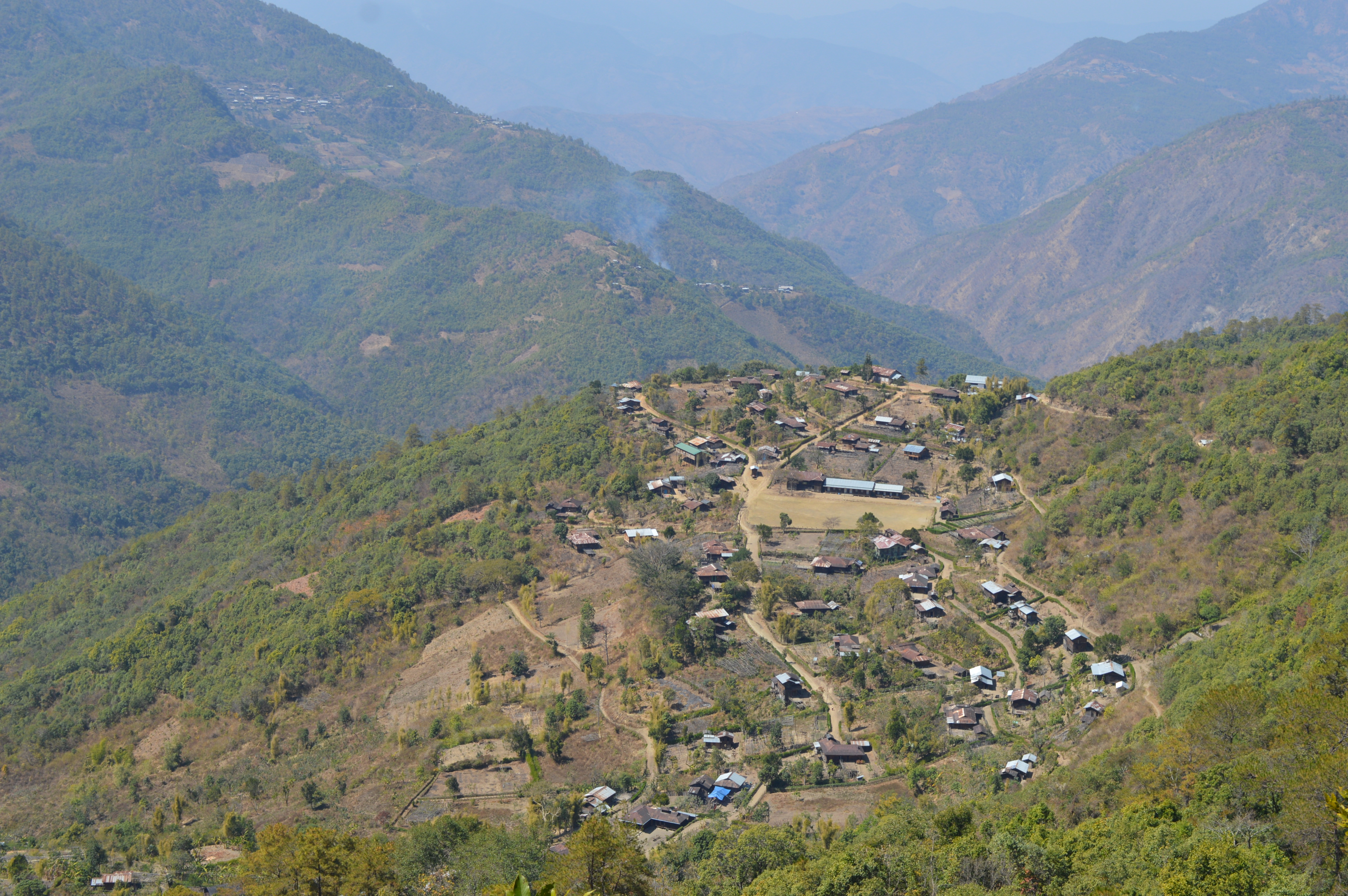
- Village in Chin State, Myanmar

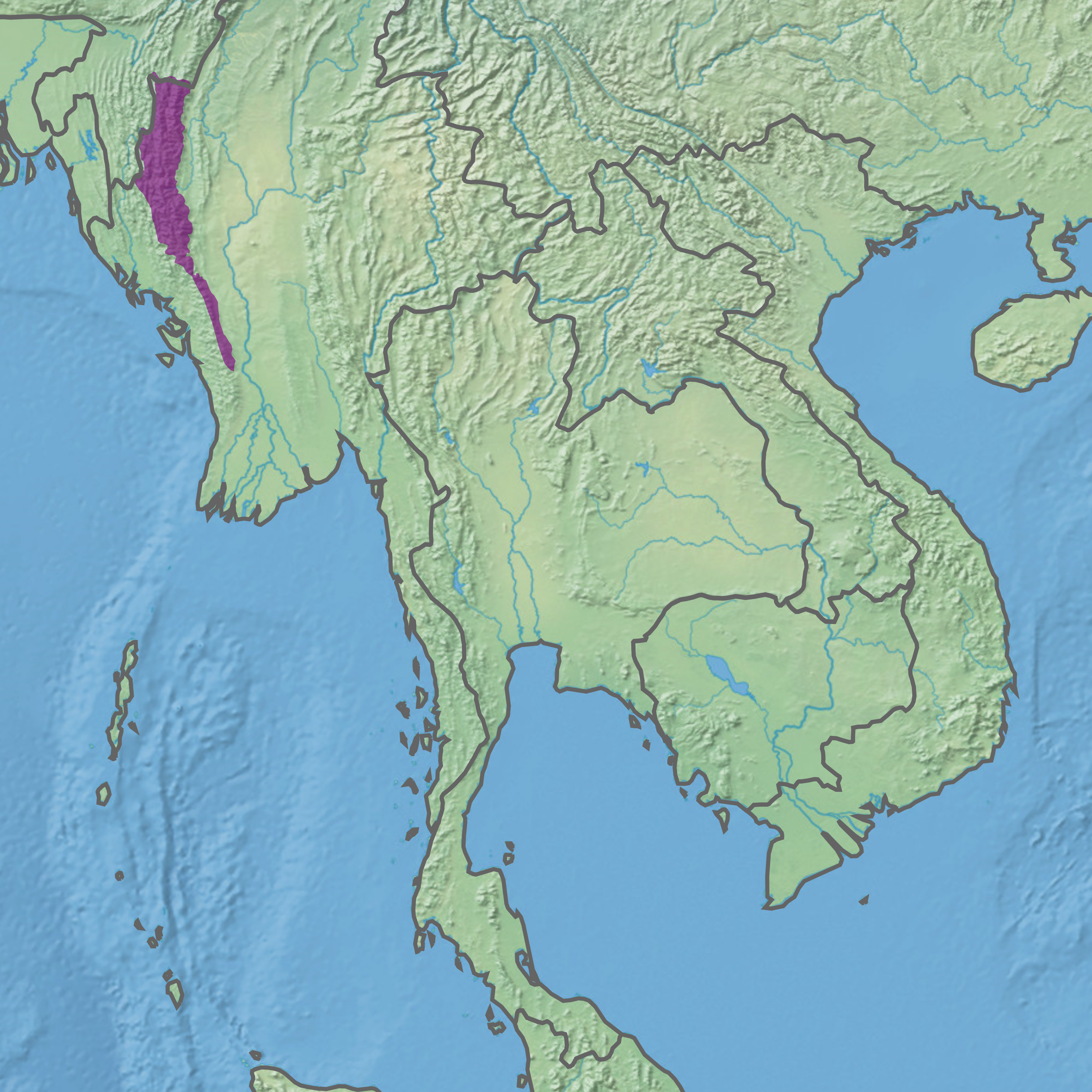
- Ecoregion territory (in purple)

Ecology
- Realm: Indomalayan
- Biome: tropical and subtropical moist broadleaf forests
- Borders: Irrawaddy moist deciduous forests; Mizoram–Manipur–Kachin rain forests, Northeast India–Myanmar pine forests

Geography
- Area: 29,615 km^{2} (11,434 mi^{2})
- Country: Myanmar
- States and regions: Chin State; Bago Region; Magway Region, Rakhine State

Conservation
- Conservation status: critical/endangered
- Protected: 1,763 km^{2} (6%)

The Chin Hills-Arakan Yoma montane forests is a tropical and subtropical moist broadleaf forest ecoregion in western Myanmar (Burma). Surrounded at lower elevations by moist tropical forests, this ecoregion is home to a diverse range of subtropical and temperate species, including many species characteristic of the Himalayas, as well as many endemic species.

== Setting ==
The ecoregion covers an area of 29,700 square kilometers (11,500 sq mi), encompassing the montane forests of the Arakan Mountains. The Chin Hills, which cover most of Myanmar's Chin State, and extend south along the ridge of the Arakan Mountains forms the boundary between Rakhine State on the west and Magway Region, Bago Region, and Ayeyarwady Region to the east.

The ecoregion is bounded by the Mizoram–Manipur–Kachin rain forests to the west, north, and northeast, and the Irrawaddy moist deciduous forests to the east. Two enclaves of Northeast India–Myanmar pine forests lie immediately to the north.

The ecoregion includes Nat Ma Taung (Mount Victoria) in southern Chin State, which rises to 3,109 metres (10,200 ft) above sea level.

Lower montane forests occur below 1000 meters elevation. Dominant canopy trees include Bauhinia variegata, Lagerstroemia speciosa, Derris robusta, and species of Ficus, Hibiscus, and Strobilanthes. Lianas drape the mature forests, especially Congea tomentosa and Mucuna pruriens.

Mixed evergreen broadleaf forest is predominant between 1000 and 2100 meters elevation. Species of oak (Quercus), Castanopsis, Eugenia, Saurauia, Eriobotrya, and Schima are the dominant canopy trees.

Montane cloud forests occur above 2000 meters elevation. In the transition zone to the lower-elevation mixed broadleaf evergreen forests, the predominant tree species are typical of the Himalayas, including Alnus nepalensis, Betula alnoides, and species of Carpinus, Prunus, Pyrus, and Torreya. At higher elevations, species of Castanea, Cornus, Eriobotrya, Laurus, and Taxus become more common. Epiphytes grow abundantly on the trees in the montane cloud forests, common epiphytes include species of Aeschynanthus and Agapetes, Rhododendron cuffeanum, aroids, and the orchids Dendrobium and Pleione. The tree Lithocarpus xylocarpus is common between 2,400 and 2,750 meters elevation. Rhododendron arboreum and Quercus semecarpifolia are dominant above 2,750 meters elevation.

Above 3000 meters elevation on Nat Ma Taung, shrub forests of Hypericum patulum and Rhododendron burmanicum occur, with herbaceous plants including species of Aconitum, Lactuca, Pedicularis, and Veronica. Some summit ridges are covered in a temperate shrub savanna, with shrub species of Rhododendron, Buddleja, Daphne, Leycesteria, and Lonicera interspersed among tall grasses and herbs including species of Aconitum, Delphinium, Geranium, and Thalictrum.

== Fauna ==
The ecoregion is home to several threatened and endangered mammals, including the hoolock gibbon (Hylobates hoolock), tiger (Panthera tigris), leopard (Panthera pardus), clouded leopard (Pardofelis nebulosa), sun bear (Ursus malayanus), Eld's deer or thamin (Cervus eldii), and gaur (Bos gaurus). There are no endemic mammals.

Three bird species are endemic to the ecoregion – the striped laughingthrush (Trochalopteron virgatus), brown-capped laughingthrush (Trochalopteron austeni), and white-browed nuthatch (Sitta victoriae).

== Conservation ==
A 2017 assessment found that 1,763 square kilometres (681 sq mi), or 6%, of the ecoregion is in protected areas. Protected areas include Bwe Par Taung National Park and Natmataung National Park. Another 84% of the ecoregion is forested outside protected areas.
