= Northeast India–Myanmar pine forests =

Ecoregion in Myanmar and India

- Terrace cultivation in Pfütsero, Nagaland

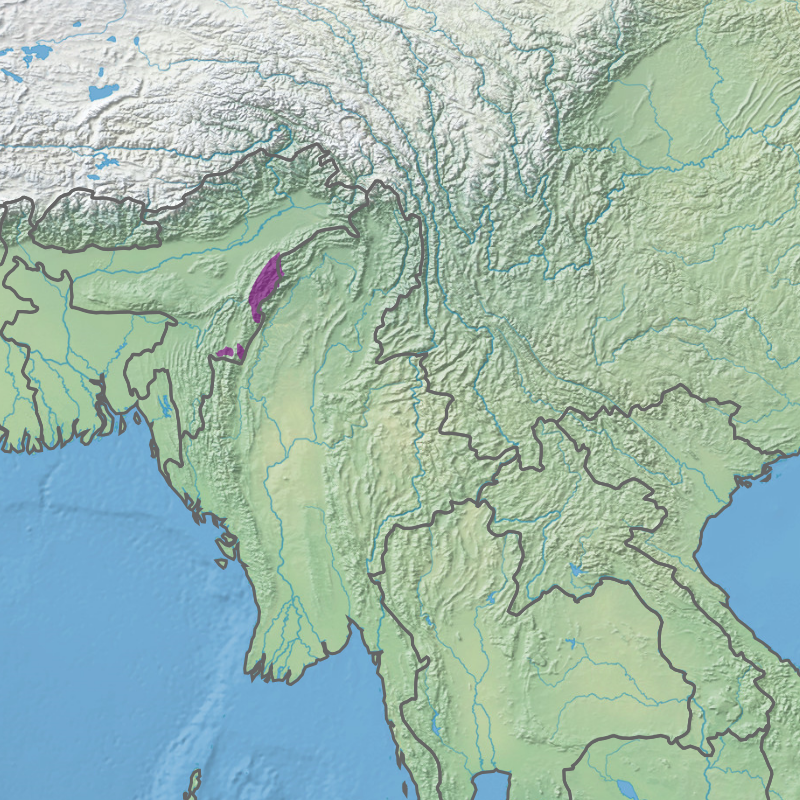
- Ecoregion territory (in purple)

Ecology
- Realm: Indomalayan
- Biome: tropical and subtropical coniferous forests
- Borders: Mizoram–Manipur–Kachin rain forests; Chin Hills–Arakan Yoma montane forests; Eastern Himalayan broadleaf forests

Geography
- Area: 9,700 km^{2} (3,700 sq mi)
- Countries: India; Myanmar
- States: Nagaland; Mizoram
- Coordinates: 25°54′N 94°46′E

The Northeast India-Myanmar pine forests is a montane subtropical coniferous forest ecoregion in the mountains of Northeastern India and adjacent portions of Myanmar (also known as Burma).

== Setting ==
The ecoregion covers an area of 9,700 square kilometres (3,700 sq mi) of the Naga Hills that with the Patkai (including the Lushai Hills) and the Manipur Hills form part of the Burmese-Java arc of folded mountains that run south-east of the Himalayas and make up the India-Myanmar border region. The pine forests are found between 1,500–2,500 metres (4,900–8,200 ft) in elevation, and occur in three separate enclaves. The largest enclave straddles the boundary between India's Nagaland state and Myanmar, and the two smaller enclaves grows in the southern part of India's Mizoram state, also along the Myanmar border. The pine forests are surrounded at lower elevations by the predominantly broadleaf Mizoram–Manipur–Kachin rain forests and are part of the huge Burma Monsoon Forest transition zone between the South Asia and Indochina regions.

== Flora ==
The pine forests forms a habitat that is rare in the Indomalayan realm. Tenasserim pine (Pinus latteri) is the dominant species at lower elevations, sometimes associated with dipterocarps. At higher elevations, Khasi pine (P. kesiya) and blue pine (P. wallichiana) are the predominant species, associated with other evergreens including hemlocks (Tsuga) and firs (Abies), and broadleaf trees, including oaks (Quercus) and maples (Acer), while Rhododendron, Ilex, Prunus, and bamboo (Arundinaria) are common understory shrubs.

== Fauna ==
Although home to a smaller variety of wildlife than the surrounding rainforest these pine forests are relatively unspoilt and therefore still important habitat for a number of species adapted to the rocky heights. When the area was surveyed by the Wildlife Conservation Society in the 1950s mammals of the pine forest included Red serow (Capricornis rubidus), sambar (rusa unicolor), Indian muntjac (Muntiacus muntjac), wild boar (Sus scrofa), and Asian black bear (ursus thibetanus) while smaller mammals include Oriental giant squirrels, Indian giant flying squirrel and civets. None of these mammals are endemic to this ecoregion.

Birds reported in the survey include the silver-breasted broadbill (Serilophus lunatus), white-naped yuhina (Yuhina bakeri), rufous-vented tit (Periparus rubidiventris), stripe-throated yuhina (Yuhina gularis), a number of Old World babblers, grey-sided laughingthrush (Garrulax caerulatus), rufous-chinned laughingthrush (Garrulax rufogularis), striated laughingthrush (Garrulax striatus), purple and green cochoas, beautiful nuthatch (Sitta formosa), sultan tit (Melanochlora sultana), some leafbirds and white-browed fulvetta (fulvetta vinipectus) while large numbers of shelduck and bar-headed goose were seen on the Chindwin River. Two more species of laughingthrush are thought to be endemic to these mountains: brown-capped laughingthrush (Garrulax austeni) and striped laughingthrush (Garrulax virgatus).

== Threats and preservation ==
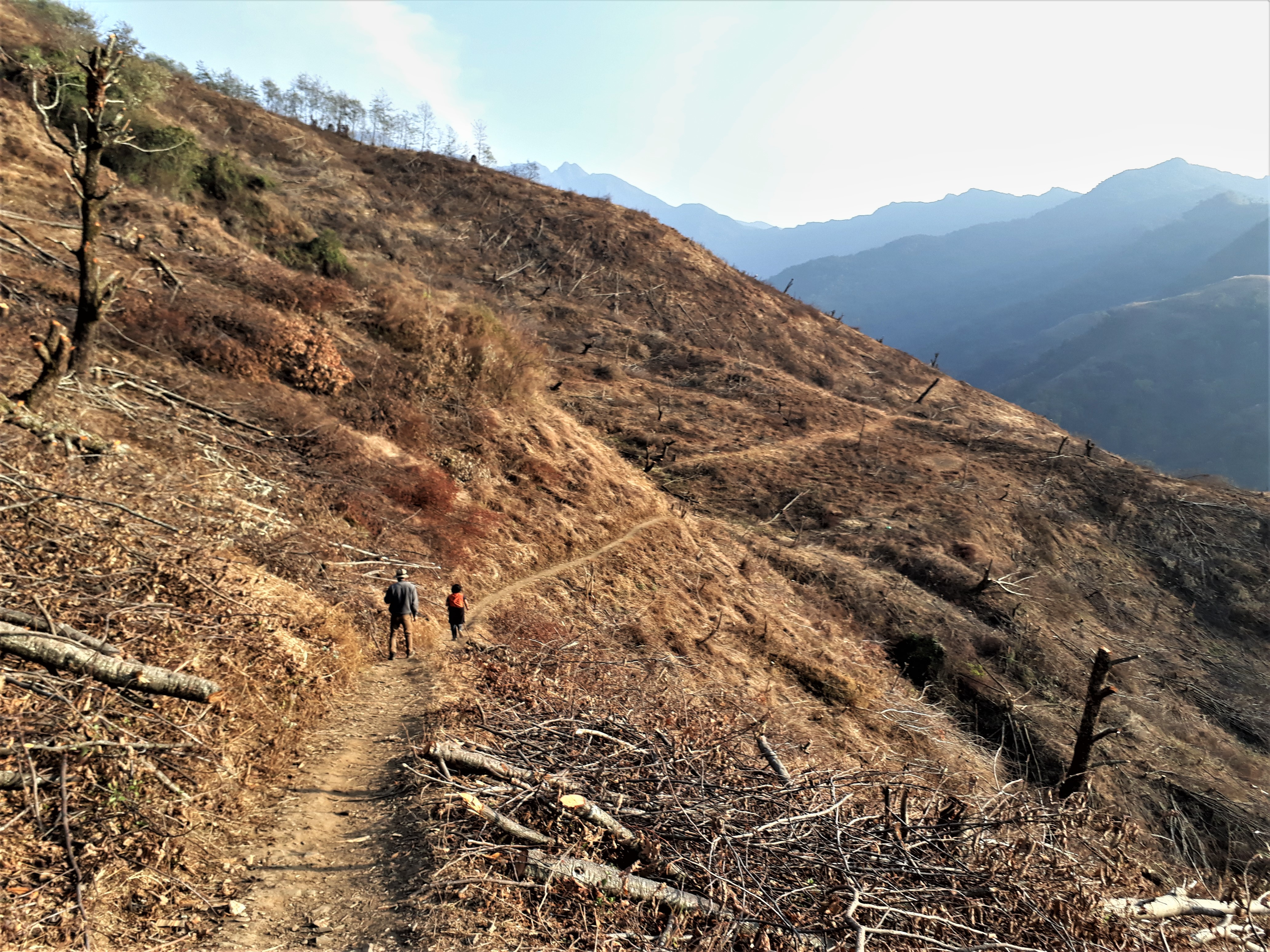
Clearing land for cultivation, Nagaland

These mountains have been poorly researched since the 1950s, when it was noted that patches were being systematically cleared for farming and this shifting cultivation continues today resulting in soil erosion and loss of habitat for wildlife.

== See also ==
- List of ecoregions in India
