= Mizoram–Manipur–Kachin rain forests =

Ecoregion in Indochina

Mizoram–Manipur–Kachin rain forests ecoregion
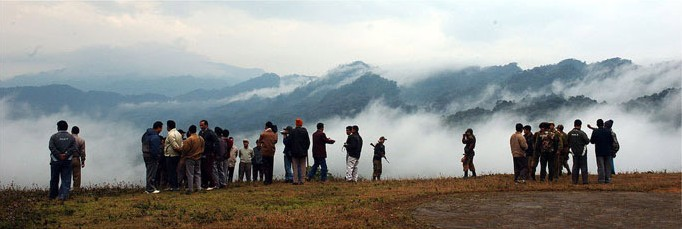
- View across the Mizoram–Manipur–Kachin rain forests. This picture is from Pangsau Pass in the north-west of the ecoregion, on the border between India and Myanmar.

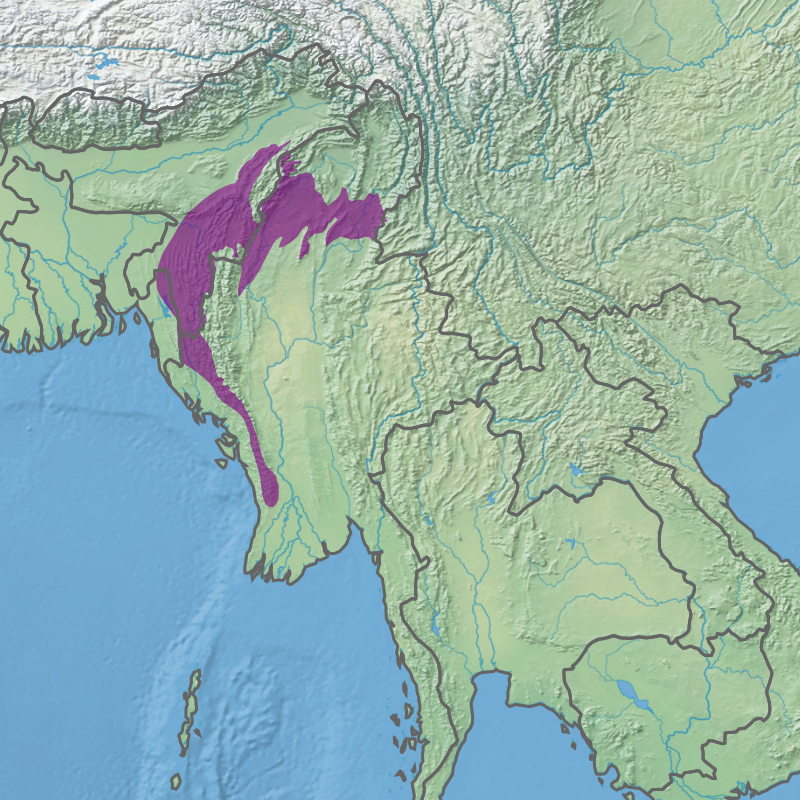
- Ecoregion territory (in purple)

Ecology
- Realm: Indomalayan
- Biome: Tropical and subtropical moist broadleaf forests
- Borders: List: Brahmaputra Valley semi-evergreen forests; Chin Hills–Arakan Yoma montane forests; Eastern Himalayan subalpine conifer forests; Irrawaddy moist deciduous forests; Lower Gangetic Plains moist deciduous forests; Meghalaya subtropical forests; Myanmar coastal rain forests; Northeast India–Myanmar pine forests; Northern Indochina subtropical forests; Northern Triangle subtropical forests
- Bird species: 580
- Mammal species: 149

Geography
- Area: 135,600 km^{2} (52,400 mi^{2})
- Countries: Bangladesh; China; India; Myanmar
- States: List: Chittagong Hill Tracts; Yunnan; Assam; Manipur; Mizoram; Nagaland; Chin State; Kachin State; Rakhine State; Sagaing Region
- Coordinates: 24°14′N 94°0′E

Conservation
- Protected: 5.9%

The Mizoram–Manipur–Kachin rain forests is a subtropical moist broadleaf forest ecoregion which occupies the lower hillsides of the mountainous border region joining Bangladesh, China's Yunnan Province, India, and Myanmar. The ecoregion covers an area of 135,600 square kilometres (52,400 sq mi). Located where the biotas of the Indian Subcontinent and the Indochinese Peninsula meet, and in the transition between subtropical and tropical regions of Asia, the Mizoram–Manipur–Kachin rain forests are home to great biodiversity. The WWF rates the ecoregion as "Globally Outstanding" in biological distinctiveness.

== Geography and neighbouring ecoregions ==
The ecoregion is characterised by semi-evergreen rain forest, covering the lower elevations of the Chin Hills and Arakan Mountains in Myanmar's Rakhine State, India's Manipur state, the adjacent Chittagong Hills of Bangladesh, and then extending northwards along the Naga Hills and Mizo Hills to cover most of India's Nagaland and Mizoram states, and also eastwards across Myanmar's Sagaing Division and Kachin State to the China–Myanmar border. China's Tongbiguan Natural Protection Area（near the China–Myanmar border) might be a part of the ecoregion.

The Myanmar coastal rain forests occupy the coastal lowlands of Myanmar south and southwest of this ecoregion. To the west, the ecoregion borders the Meghalaya subtropical forests ecoregion in the Khasi and Garo Hills, and the Brahmaputra Valley semi-evergreen forests in the Brahmaputra lowlands. The Mizoram–Manipur–Kachin rain forests extends up to the 1,000 metres (3,300 feet) elevation of the Chin Hills–Arakan Yoma range, and the Chin Hills–Arakan Yoma montane forests occupy the portion of the range above 1,000 metres (3,300 feet). As the Mizoram–Manipur–Kachin forests extend east across Myanmar, they are bounded by the Irrawaddy moist deciduous forests of the Irrawaddy River basin in the south, the higher-elevation Northern Triangle subtropical forests in the north, and the Northern Indochina subtropical forests in the east. The Northeast India–Myanmar pine forests occupy the higher elevations of the Naga Hills along the Nagaland–Myanmar border, and are surrounded by the Mizoram–Manipur–Kachin rain forests west, south and east.

=== Climate ===
The climate of the ecoregion is tropical and humid, although somewhat cooler than the adjacent lowlands. Rainfall comes mostly from the monsoon winds from the Bay of Bengal, and parts of the ecoregion can receive up to 2,000 millimetres (79 in) of rain per year.

== Flora ==
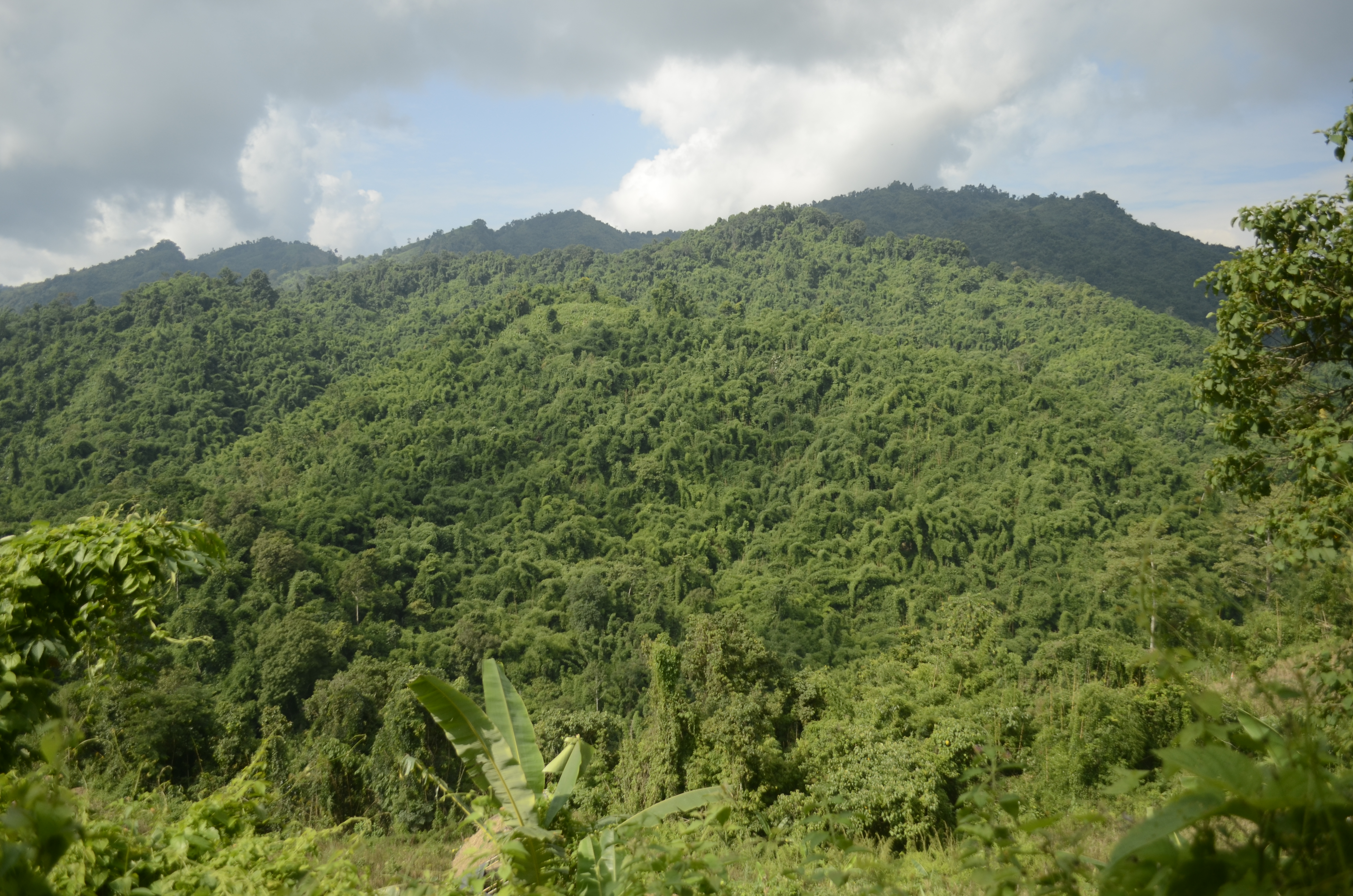
The rain forests on the Naga Hills

In the Mizoram–Manipur–Kachin rain forest, the predominant plant community is semi-evergreen rain forest, which covers the vast majority of the ecoregion's intact area, a total of 36% of the ecoregion. Other plant communities include tropical wet evergreen forest (5% of the ecoregion's total area), tropical moist deciduous forest (2%), montane wet temperate forest (2%), and subtropical montane forest (1%). 19% of the ecoregion's area has been cleared, primarily for agriculture and grazing, and 34% of the ecoregion consists of degraded areas.

The semi-evergreen rain forest is dominated by trees of the dipterocarp family, including Dipterocarpus alatus, D. turbinatus, D. griffithii, Parashorea stellata, Hopea odorata, Shorea burmanica, and Anisoptera scaphula. Trees of other families include Swintonia floribunda, Eugenia grandis, Xylia xylocarpa, Gmelina arborea, Bombax insignis, Bombax ceiba, Albizia procera, and Castanopsis spp.

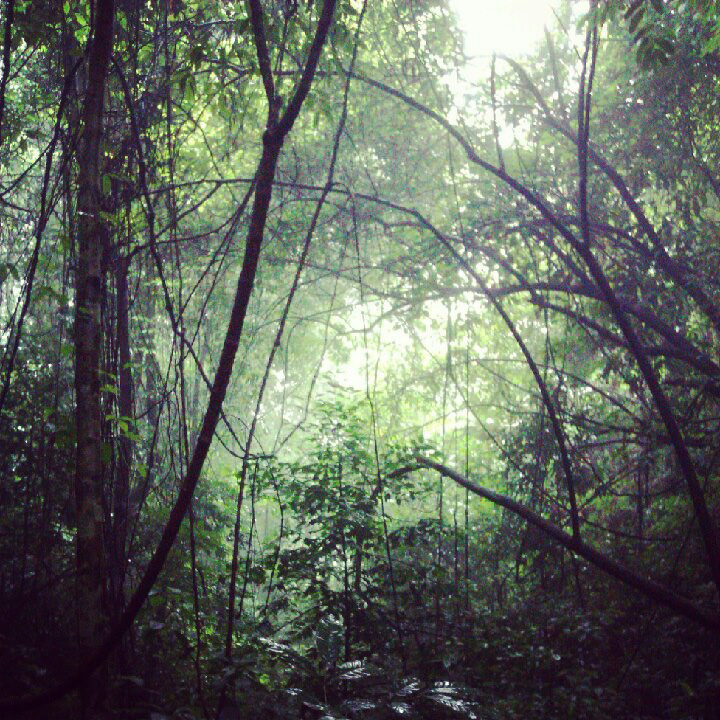
Inside the rainforests

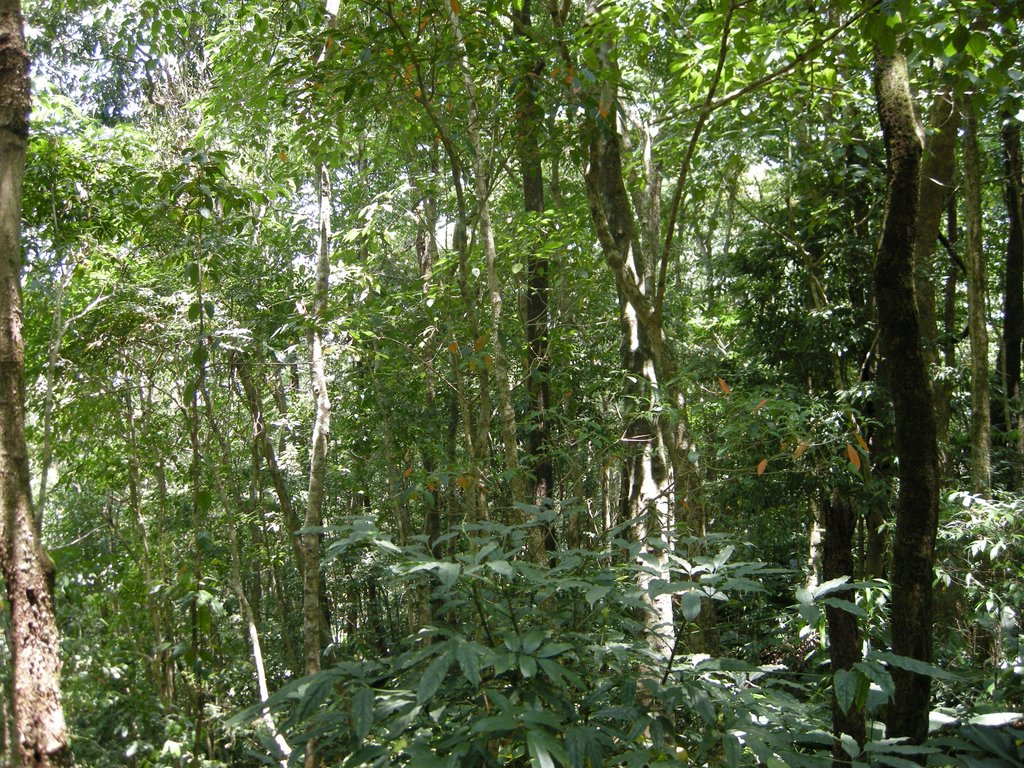
Rainforests in the Dampa Tiger Reserve Forest

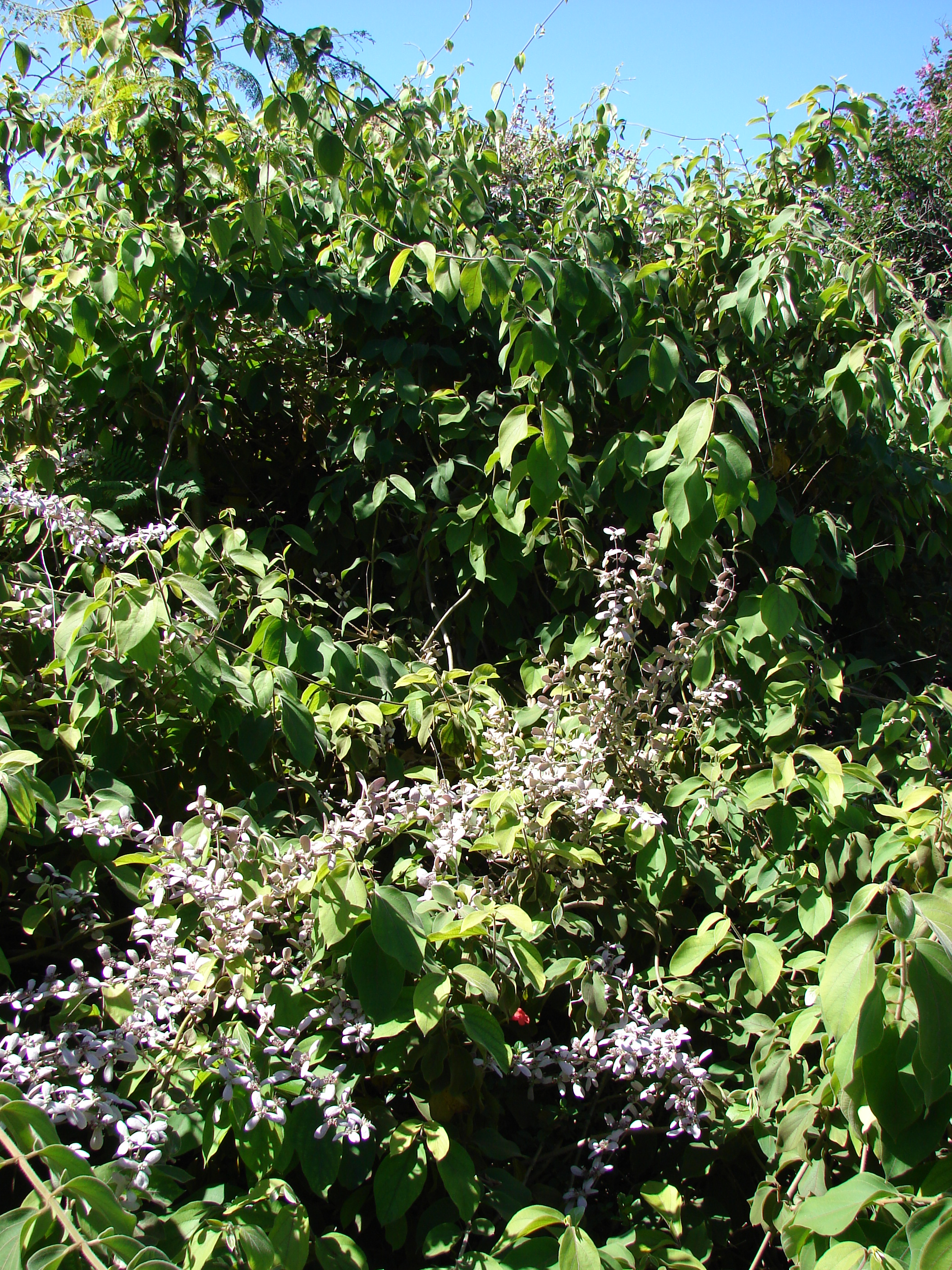
Vines like the Shower Orchid are common

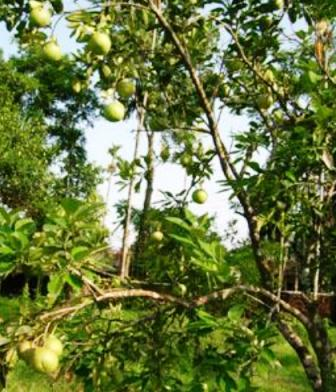
Wild orange (citrus macroptera) is native to this ecoregion (Sylhet region)

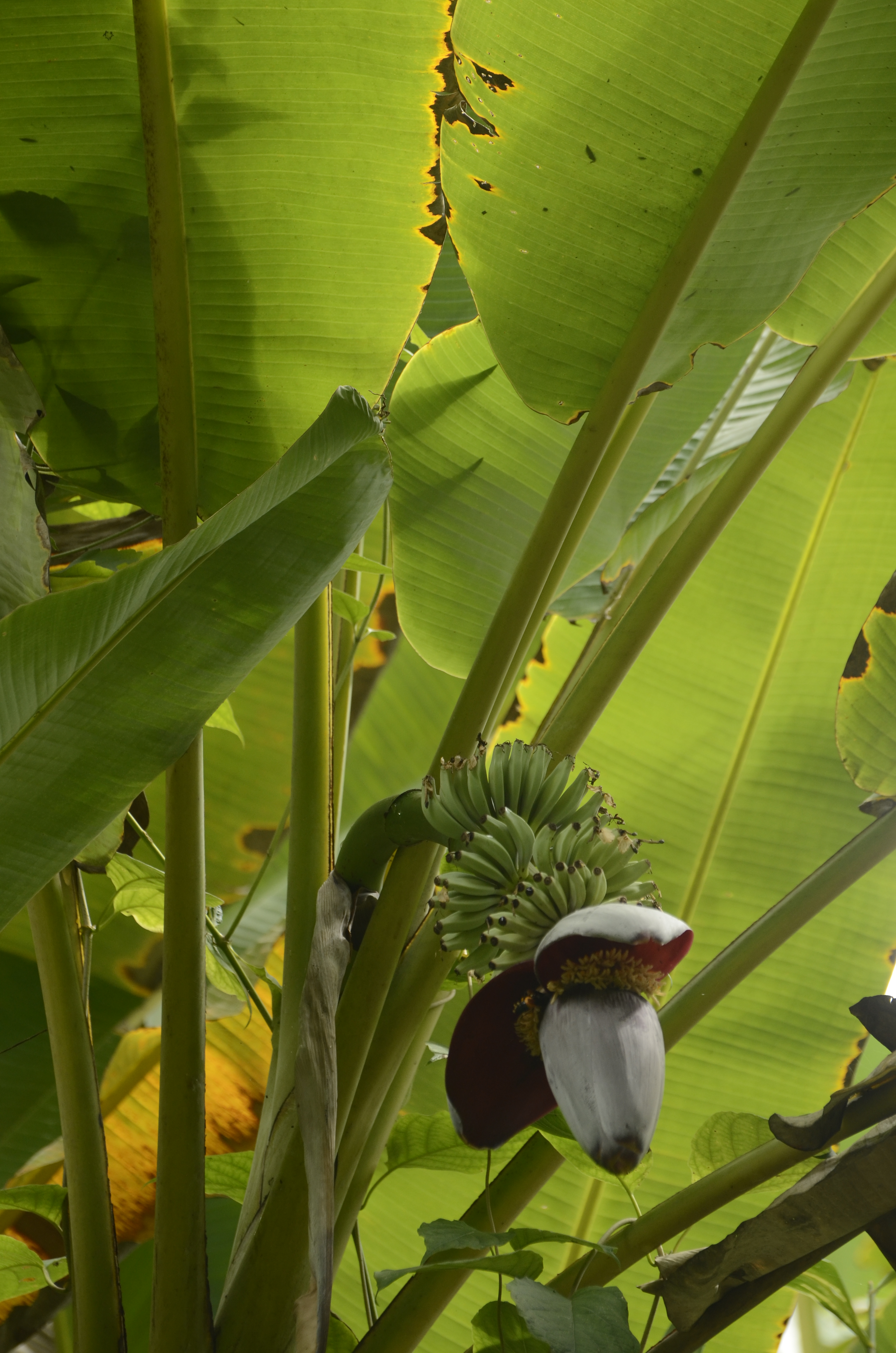
Trees of the banana-genus grows wild. This particular tree is unidentified.

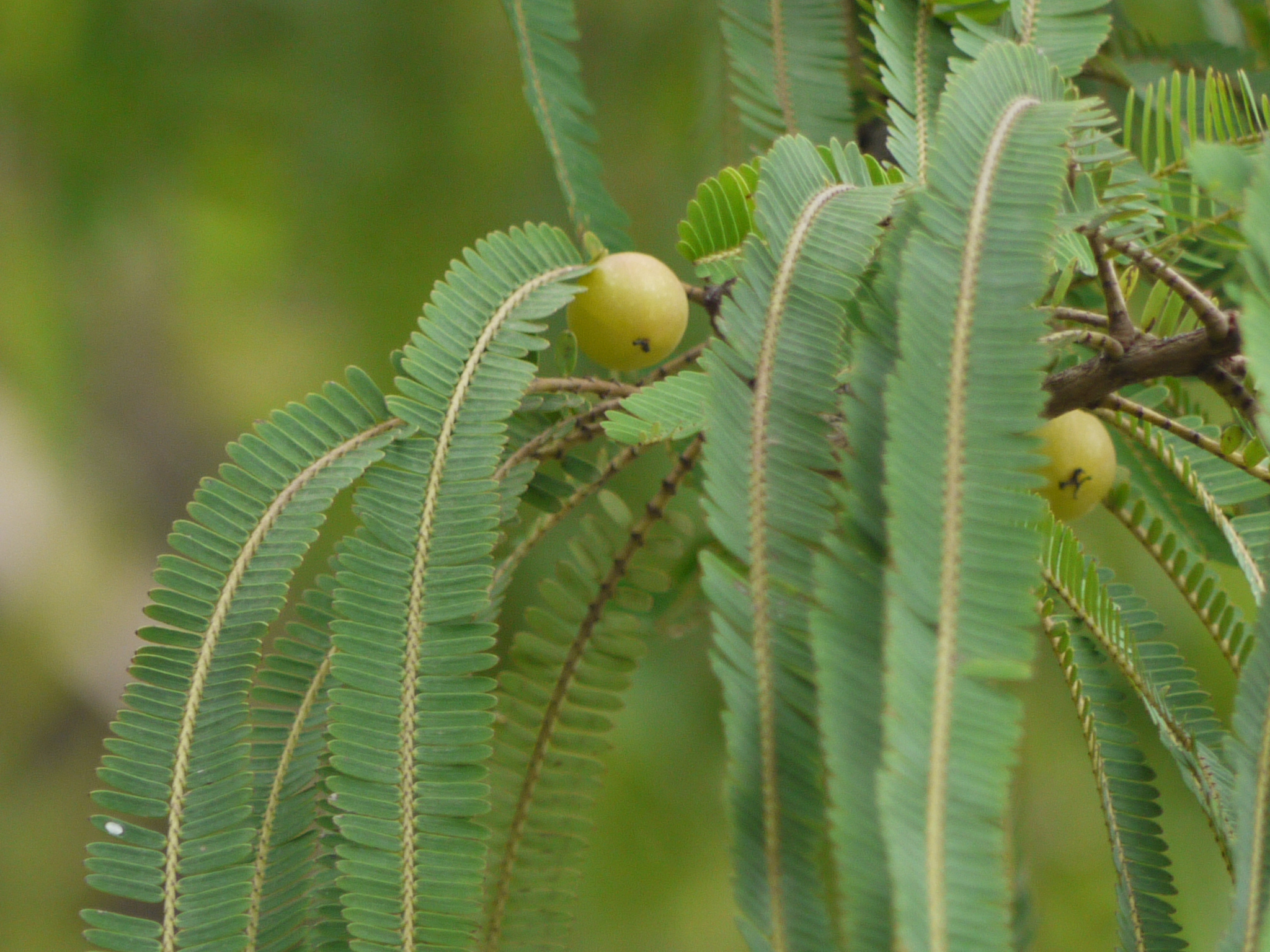
Amla trees grows wild

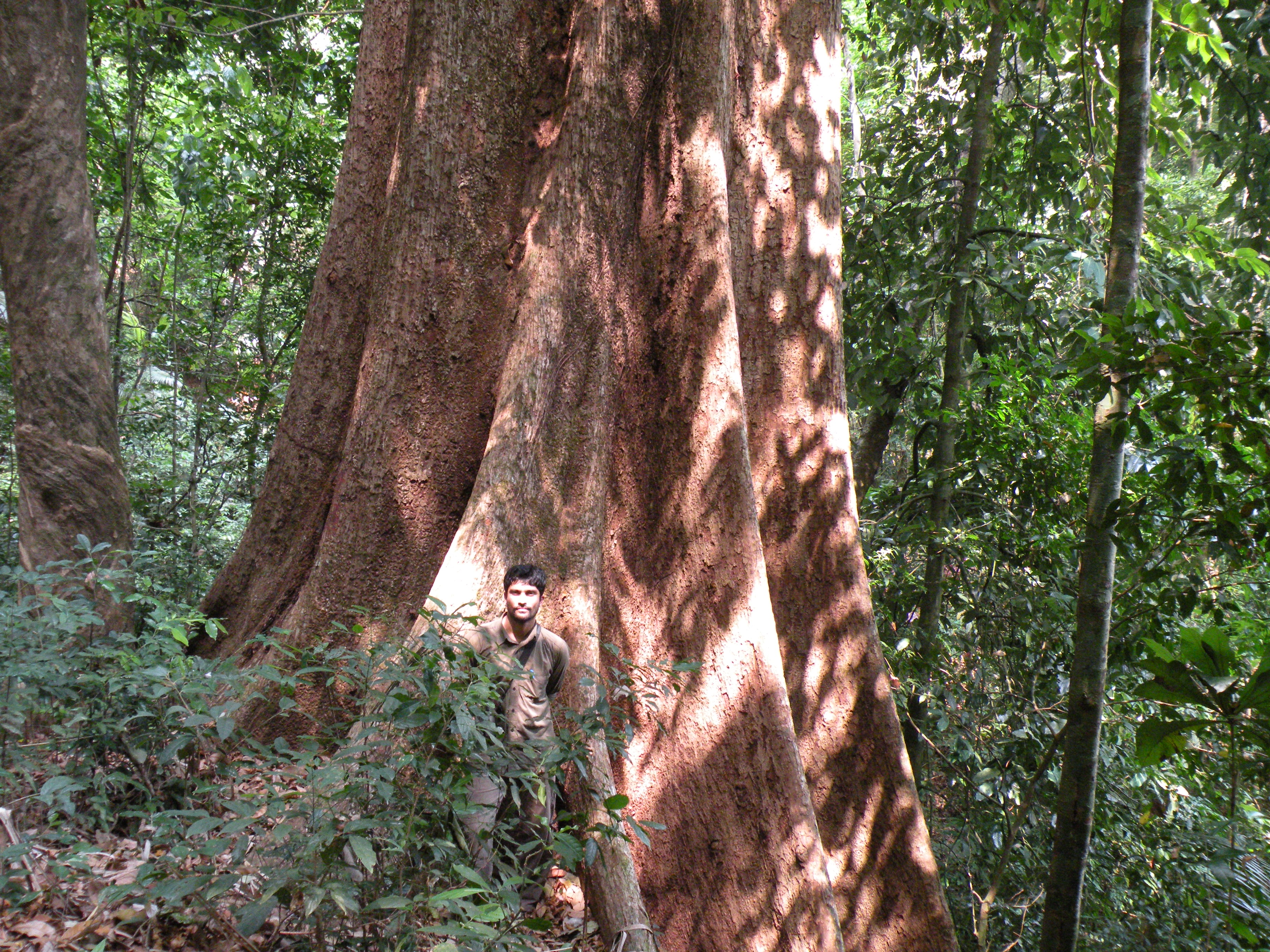
Silk-cotton tree (bombax ceiba) is one of many common tree types. In the forests, this tree can grow very large.

== Fauna ==
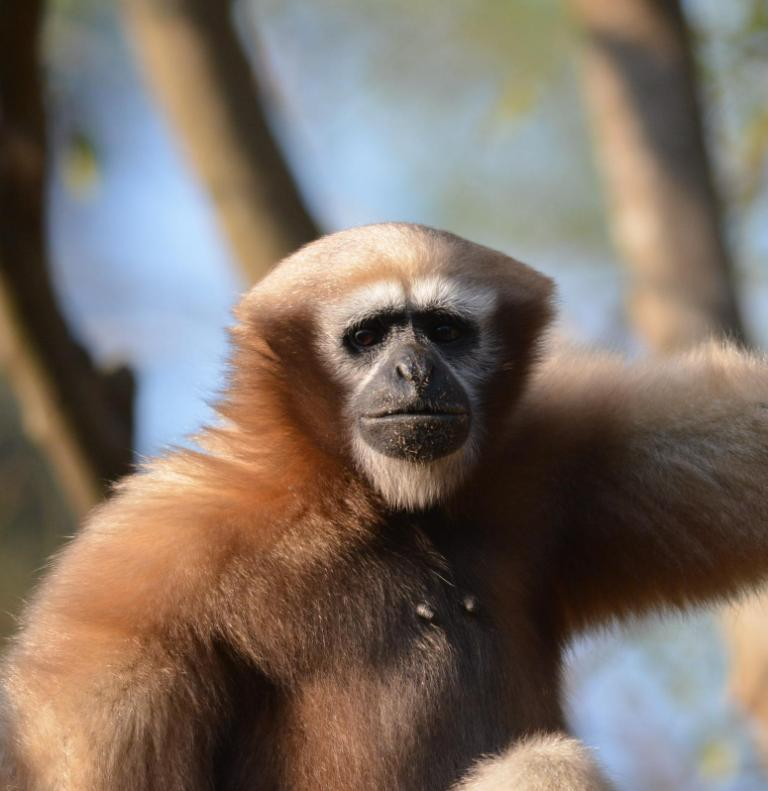
The forests are home to hoolock gibbons

The ecoregion is home to 149 known species of mammals. This includes two near-endemic species, a bat Pipistrellus joffrei, and a murid rodent Hadromys humei. The ecoregion is home to several endangered and threatened mammal species, including the tiger (Panthera tigris), clouded leopard (Pardofelis nebulosa), Asian elephant (Elephas maximus), Eld's deer (Cervus eldii), gaur (Bos gaurus), Himalayan goral (Nemorhaedus goral), red panda (Ailurus fulgens), smooth-coated otter (Lutrogale perspicillata), Indian civet (Viverra zibetha), back-striped weasel (Mustela strigidorsa), Assamese macaque (Macaca assamensis), bear macaque (Macaca arctoides), southern pig-tailed macaque (Macaca nemestrina), capped leaf monkey (Semnopithecus pileatus), and hoolock gibbon (Hylobates hoolock).

The ecoregion harbours 580 bird species, of which 6 are near-endemics. Some are the Manipur bush quail (Perdicula manipurensis), striped laughingthrush (Garrulax virgatus) and brown-capped laughingthrush (Garrulax austeni).

== Protected areas ==
5.9% of the ecoregion is in protected areas. The protected areas include:

- Barail Sanctuary
- Dampa Tiger Reserve
- Htamanthi Wildlife Sanctuary
- Hukaung Valley Wildlife Sanctuary (extension)
- Indawgyi Wildlife Sanctuary
- Intanki National Park
- Intanki Sanctuary
- Keibul Lamjao National Park
- Khawnglung Sanctuary
- Kyauk Pan Taung Wildlife Sanctuary
- Loktak Lake – Ramsar Site, Wetland of International Importance
- Murlen National Park
- Ngengpui Sanctuary
- Pablakhali Wildlife Sanctuary
- Phawngpui Blue Mountain National Park
- Pidaung Wildlife Sanctuary
- Puliebadze Sanctuary
- Rakhine Yoma Elephant Range
- Yangoupokpi-Lokchao Wildlife Sanctuary
- Jiri-Makru Wildlife Sanctuary

== See also ==
- List of ecoregions in India
- North East India
- Meghalaya subtropical forests
- Brahmaputra Valley semi-evergreen forests
- Himalayan subtropical broadleaf forests
- Margalla hills
