= Northern Triangle subtropical forests =

Ecoregion in Myanmar

Ecoregion: Northern Triangle subtropical forests
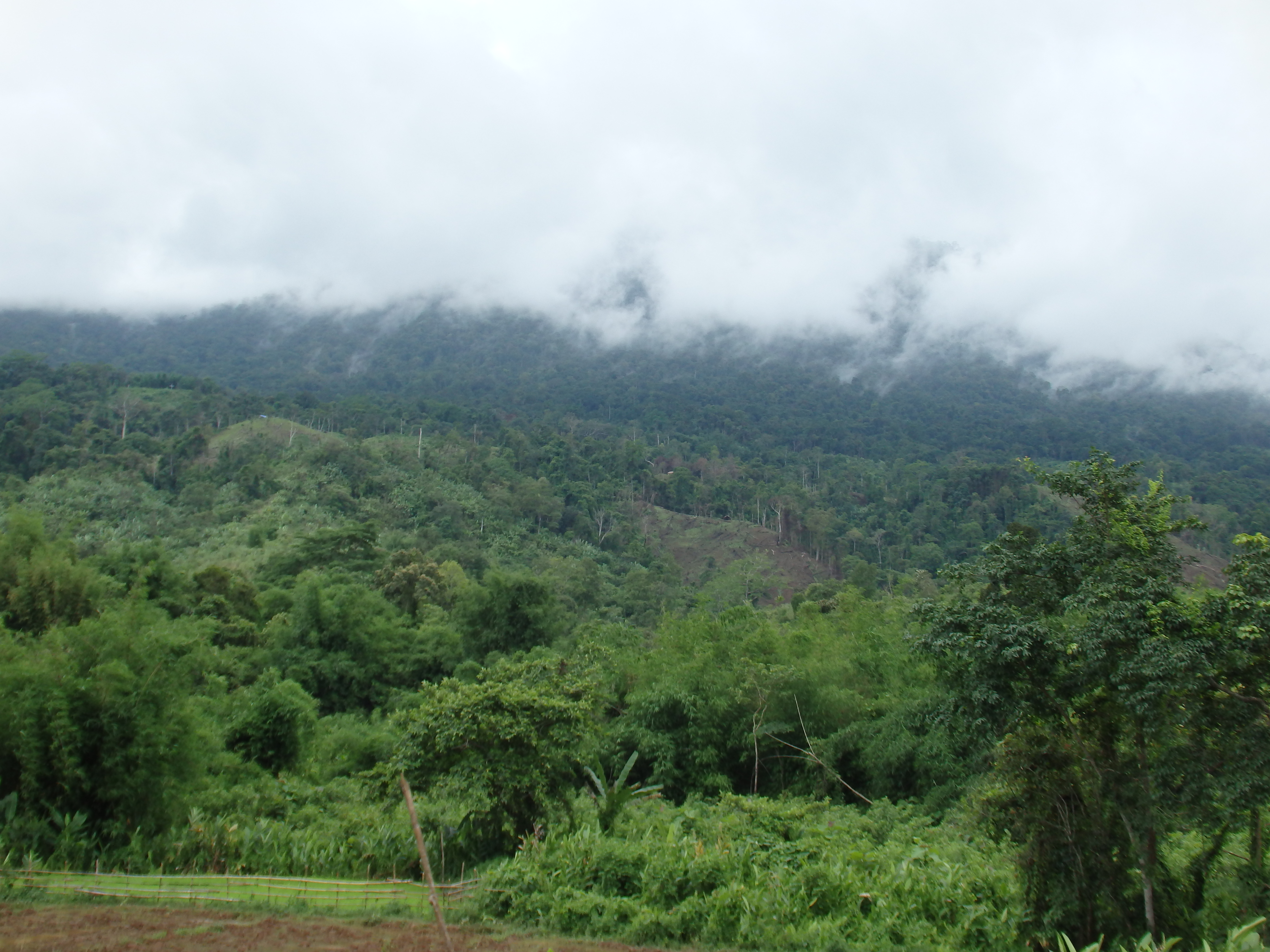
- Mist hanging over mountains north of Myitkyina, Myanmar

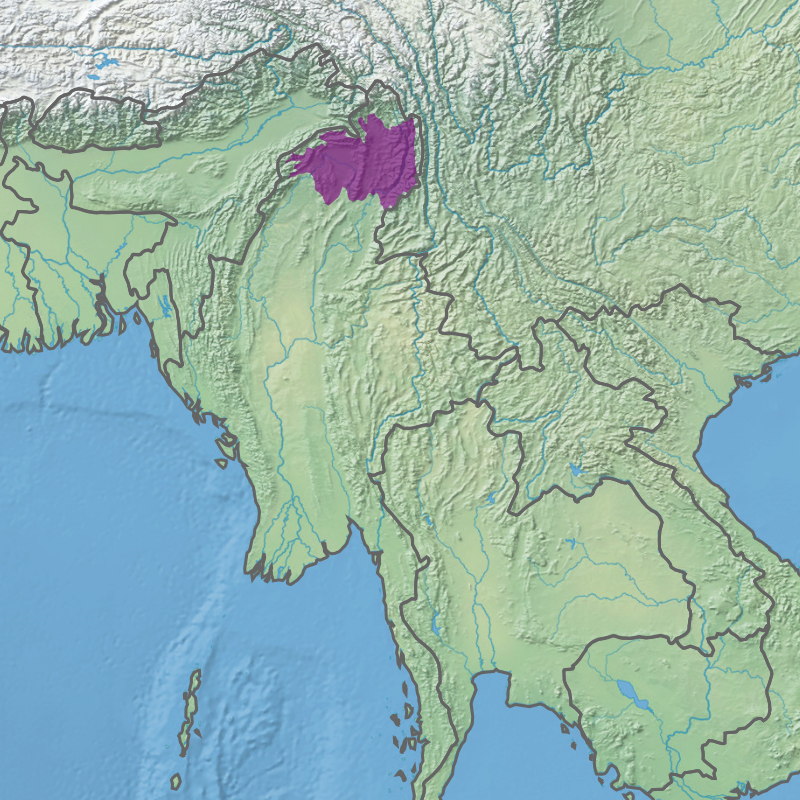
- Ecoregion territory (in purple)

Ecology
- Realm: Indomalayan
- Biome: Tropical and subtropical moist broadleaf forests
- Borders: Mizoram–Manipur–Kachin rain forests; Northern Indochina subtropical forests; Northern Triangle temperate forests; Nujiang Lancang Gorge alpine conifer and mixed forests

Geography
- Area: 53,872 km^{2} (20,800 sq mi)
- Country: Myanmar
- Coordinates: 27.75°N 97.75°E

The Northern Triangle subtropical forests ecoregion (WWF ID:IM0140) covers remote, mountainous terrain in the far north of Myanmar. Due to the regions isolation it is relatively untouched and unexplored by humans. Over 95% of the ecoregion is covered with closed evergreen forest, and importantly for conservation, these forests exist in large contiguous blocks. As of the late 1990s, 140 mammal species were known to be in the region, and new species, such the Leaf muntjac discovered in 1997, are still being found.

== Location and description ==
The ecoregion occupies roughly the middle third of Kachin State, the northernmost state of Myanmar. It is immediately south of the southeastern end of the greater Himalaya Mountains, but in lower mountains that range from 146 metres (479 ft) in the valley floors to a high point of 3,897 metres (12,785 ft). The ecoregion features two large river valleys. The Hukawng Valley in the west is on the middle course of the Chindwin River. The eastern valley follows the parallel running of the Mali River and N'Mai River; these two rivers meet at the southern edge of the ecoregion to form the Irrawaddy River. This confluence area would have been greatly affected by the construction of the proposed Myitsone Dam, but the project has been suspended.

To the north and east, the ecoregion grades in the narrow bands of the Northern Triangle temperate forests and Nujiang Lancang Gorge alpine conifer and mixed forests ecoregions, respectively, where higher altitudes and cooler climate create more temperate forests. To the south are the Mizoram–Manipur–Kachin rain forests and Northern Indochina subtropical forests ecoregions.

== Climate ==
The climate of the ecoregion is Oceanic climate, subtropical highland variety (Köppen climate classification (Cwb)). This climate has cool summers and cool, but not cold, winters. It is usually associated with coastal areas in mid-latitudes, but is also experienced at higher altitudes inland. Temperatures and precipitation are relatively even throughout the year, with no month averaging below 0 °C (32 °F), and no month averaging above 22 °C (72 °F).

== Flora and fauna ==
The ecoregion is a biodiversity hotspot, due to its location at the meeting zone of major floristic zones: Assam-Indian, Eastern Himalayan, Indo-Malayan, and Chinese. The remoteness, relatively low human population, and isolation have also contributed to the area's ecological preservation. Most of the area is covered in closed forest - 80% broadleaf evergreen and 15% needle-leaf evergreen.

Altitude zonation is important: below 2,400 meters Indo-Malayan species are dominant, while Indo-Himalayan are found mostly above. Below 915 meters the forests are tropical rainforest trees of genus Magnoliaceae, Lauraceae, and Dipterocarpaceae. Above that are trees of genus Fagaceae, and Meliaceae, plus some tree ferns and climbing palms. Trees in mature forests are typically draped in lianas.

Over 140 species of mammals, and 370 species of birds are known in the ecoregion. The large un-fragmented forests are valuable for supporting large mammals, including the endangered Tiger Panthera tigris, the endangered Red panda Ailurus fulgens, the endangered Asian elephant Elephas maximus, and vulnerable Takin Budorcas taxicolor.

== Protected areas ==
Officially protected areas cover over 35% of the ecoregion, including:

- Hukaung Valley Wildlife Sanctuary, covers 17,373 km2, mostly of evergreen and mixed deciduous forest.
- Hponkanrazi Wildlife Sanctuary,
- Bumhpa Bum Wildlife Sanctuary, a mountainous area of tropical evergreen forest and hill pine forest.

== Villages ==
- N'Gum La
