= Gaoligongshan National Nature Reserve =

Nature reserve in China

- GNRR
- IUCN category V (protected landscape/seascape)
- Interactive map of Gaoligongshan National Nature Reserve
- Location: Western Yunnan, China
- Nearest city: Baoshan City
- Coordinates: 24.66°N 98.42°E
- Area: 4,055.49 km^{2} (1,565.83 mi^{2})
- Established: 1986
- Governing body: Yunan Gaoligongshan National Nature Reserve Bureau
- World Heritage site: Man and the Biosphere Programme
- Website: http://www.glgs.gov.cn/ glgs.gov.cn

The Gaoligongshan National Nature Reserve (GNNR) is a protected area comprising the Gaoligong Mountains and the nearby Nu Jiang Reserve in the western Yunnan Province of China, near the international border with Burma. It covers a vast stretch of the junction of Baoshan City, Tengchong, and Lushui County, towards the west side of Nu (Salween) River.

It is a nature reserve of China, under the authority of the Chinese Ministry of Forestry. It is also recognized by international organizations: it is a Protected Area of the World Wildlife Fund, a World Biosphere Reserve, and a part of the Three Parallel Rivers World Heritage Site.

== Geography ==
Gaoligongshan National Nature Reserve covers an altitude ranging from the Nujiang lowlands (700 m) to alpine Gaolingong environment. The reserve runs 9 km (5.6 mi) from east to west and 135 km (84 mi) from south to north. Out of the total area, 85% is covered by natural forest. The region receives a high average annual rainfall of 1000–4000 mm. The climate is cool and dry from November to April, and warm and wet between May and October. Wona (3,916 m) is the highest peak in the reserve, and the highest areas are restricted as an inviolate core, where visitors are not allowed. The only exception is along the southern Silk Road, which is the only access to the highest elevations in the reserve.

The unique climatic condition of the area allows a complete transition from temperate to tropical forest, which is rare in the world. The forest is broadly classified as Sino-Himalayan Temperate Forest and Sino-Himalayan Subtropical Forest. More specifically, the forest types include tropical rainforest and seasonal tropical forest (<1,000 m above sea level), laurel forest (1,000–2,600 m), temperate (montane) deciduous broad-leaf forest (1,000–3,000 m), subalpine coniferous forest (2,700–3,500 m), alpine meadow (>3,400 m), and alpine tundra. In addition, the reserve contains part of the Nujiang Langcang Gorge alpine conifer and mixed forests and Northern Indochina subtropical forests.

=== Socioeconomic condition ===
As an international border, the reserve serves as a corridor of immigration and a melting pot of ethnics and nationalities. The reserve is home to about 360,000 people belonging to 16−20 ethnic minorities. There are approximately 16 nationalities belonging to 109 administrative villages, 19 townships, and 5 counties. Han, Dai, Lisu, Hui, Bai, Miao, Yi, Zhuang, Nu, Achang, Jingpo, Wa, de'ang, Nakhi, Derung, and Tibetan form the multicultural population.

The major livelihood patterns of these inhabitants are agriculture (especially of cash crops such as sugarcane), household industries such as handicrafts, carpentry, and logging. There are local organisations such as the Gaoligongshan Farmers’ Biodiversity and Conservation Association, a small tourism organisation in Dayutang, and a women’s association in Manghuang that are promoting alternative livelihoods to save the reserve. Ecotourism has developed into one of the major means of subsistence among the inhabitants. The Chinese Ministry of Forestry has allotted 8,550 hectares for tourism development.

== Biodiversity ==
With its range of natural forests, the National Nature Reserve protects a large number of flora and fauna, and especially rare and endemic species. According to available statistics, there are 2,389 animal types in the reserve, and 82 of them are categorised as "nationally important". Summary can be given as follows:

=== Wildlife ===
There are about 205 species of wild mammals classified under 32 families and 10 orders. These include:

- Hoolock gibbon
- Assamese macaque
- Phayre's leaf monkey
- Indochinese leopard
- clouded leopard
- marbled cat
- red goral
- Bengal slow loris
- Chinese pangolin
- rhesus monkey
- stump-tailed macaque
- Asian black bear
- red panda
- river otter
- large Indian civet
- dwarf musk deer
- black musk deer
- Gongshan muntjac
- eastern sambar

=== Birds ===
525 species of birds are recorded, which fall under 58 families and 19 orders. Species under protection are Sclater's monal, golden eagle, cinereous vulture, Mrs. Hume's pheasant, kalij pheasant, satyr tragopan, and silver pheasant.

=== Fish ===
There are 49 species of fish, and among them are the rare Lu River schizothoracin, Schizothorax myzostomus, and Burmese loach.

=== Vegetation ===
There are 2,514 native floristic species and 302 varieties in record that belong to 778 genera and 171 families. Some 318 species (12 families) are endemic. Endemic genera include Paragutzlaffia, Metapanax, Notoseris, Syncalathium, Heteropolygonatum, Davidia, Berneuxia, Whytochia, Gaoligongshania, Eurycorymbus, Pterygiella, Dickinsia, and Sinolimprichtia. It is the native home of azaleas (over 800 varieties), arguably the most famous flower in China; the unique species are: white Sim’s azalea, yellow azalea, Photinia glomerata, Rosa biflora, raspberry, Sorbus astateria, Bulbophyllum dulongense, Calanthe dulongensis, Coelogyne gongshanensis, Davidia involucrata.

Towards the eastern lower foothills, the dominant species are Lithocarpus variolosus, Castanopsis sp., Cyclobalanopsis lamellosa, and several species of Rhododendron. The high mountain slopes (2,800-3,200 m) mostly contain shrubs such as Rosa sp., Rubus sp., Sorbus sp., Gentiana sp., and Pedicularis sp. The western slope is mostly disturbed and contains few species of Lithocarpus sp., Acer davidii, Rosa omeiensis, Iris tectorum and Elaeocarpus sp. The mid-elevation wet evergreen forest is mostly rich in epiphytes such as orchids and ferns.

=== Threatened species ===
The reserve is the home to many vulnerable and endangered species of animals. Vulnerable species include Hoolock leuconedys, Budorcas taxicolor, Cervus unicolor, Helarctos malayanus, and Neofelis nebulosa. Endangered species include Ailurus fulgens, Trachypithecus phayrei, and Cuon alpinus. As many as 55 species of plants are also endangered. All the 14 endemic genera are under the International Union for Conservation of Nature (IUCN) risk category. Out of these, 10 taxa are critically endangered, 5 are endangered, 10 are considered vulnerable to extinction, and 107 are still data deficient.

==== Discovery of new monkey species ====
A new species of snub-nosed monkey, Rhinopithecus strykeri, which was originally described from northern Burma in 2012, was also discovered in the reserve in 2011. On the morning of 16 October 2011, a forest guard at the reserve took photos of a group of snub-nosed monkeys which were later identified as R. strykery. This made a breaking headline in China especially on the urgent a need of conservation programme. The monkey is a critically threatened species. The new species was heralded as one of the Top 10 New Species 2012 by the International Institute for Species Exploration. In 2012, it was also listed at 9th place of the Top 10 weirdest new species by the Chinese news portal, China.org.cn.

== Conservation programmes ==
=== History and development ===
In 1983, the southern section of Gaoligong Mountains was declared as Gaoligong Shan Nature Reserve by the Yunnan provincial government. It consisted of Tengchong County and Longyang District of Baoshan City, and Lushui County of Nujiang Lisu Autonomous Prefecture. The conservation was extended in 1986 and nationally recognised as a National Nature Reserve. The merged forest reserve became Gaoligongshan National Nature Reserve. In 1992, the World Wildlife Fund (WWF) branded it as Class-A nature reserve with international significance. In 1997, Bio Diversity of National Conditions of China determined it as one of China’s 17 biodiversity-protecting zones of global importance. In 2000, the reserve was expanded to incorporate Nu River Provincial Nature Reserve around the Nu River valley and was declared part of the Man and the Biosphere Programme (World Biosphere Reserve) by UNESCO. During the 2003 World Heritage Convention, it was included as a part of the Three Parallel Rivers of Yunnan Protected Areas, thereby becoming a part of the UNESCO World Heritage Site.

=== Management ===
The reserve is divided into three administrative blocks of which two prefecture bureaus are in Baoshan City (Baoshan Administrative Office of Gaoligong Mountain National Nature Reserve) and one in Nujiang Prefecture (Nujiang Administrative Office of Gaoligong Mountain National Nature Reserve). The reserve headquarters is Baihualing, which is known for its exquisite bird watching site.

=== Challenges ===
As the habitation of a significant number of human populations, the reserve continuously is under threat from human activities. Agriculture remains the leading problem, especially with the heavy use of chemical fertilizers. There is continued expansion of croplands, pastures, and farming encroachment grazing into the reserve. Logging of trees for timber and firewood is destroying the natural sustainability. Alternate sources of subsistence and fuels are a serious need to improve the deteriorating situation. Currently, the foremost threat is construction of dams and reservoirs—the Chinese government is developing plans to build a series of 13 dams in the Nu River which could adversely affect the ecosystem.

== See also ==
- Gaoligong Mountains
