= Hkakaborazi National Park =

National park in Myanmar

- Burmese: ခါကာဘိုရာဇီအမျိုးသားဥယျာဉ်
- IUCN category II (national park)
- Location within Myanmar
- Location: Nogmung Township, Kachin State Myanmar
- Nearest city: Putao
- Coordinates: 28.135°N 97.870°E
- Area: 1,472 mi^{2} (3,810 km^{2})
- Established: 1998
- Governing body: Ministry of Natural Resources and Environmental Conservation

Hkakaborazi National Park is a national park in northern Myanmar with an area of 1,472 mi^{2} (3,810 km^{2}). It was established in 1998. It surrounds Hkakabo Razi, the highest mountain in the country.

It ranges in elevation from 2,950 to 18,730 ft (900 to 5,710 m) comprising evergreen forest and mixed deciduous forests in Nogmung Township, Kachin State. It is managed by the Nature and Wildlife Conservation Division. It is contiguous with Bumhpa Bum Wildlife Sanctuary and Hukaung Valley Wildlife Sanctuary. These protected areas together with Hponkanrazi Wildlife Sanctuary comprise the largest continuous expanse of natural forest called the Northern Forest Complex stretching over an area of 11,624 mi^{2} (30,110 km^{2}). Its objective is to conserve the biodiversity of the Ayeyarwady and Chindwin river basins.

== Biodiversity ==
=== Flora ===
The vegetation in Hkakaborazi National Park comprises tropical rain forest, laurel forest and coniferous forest. Shrubs growing in riverine areas include Rhododendron simsii, Homonoia riparia, Ficus, Phyllanthus, Ligustrum, Camellia and Euonymus species. Flowering trees like Wightia gigantea, Dipterocarpus alatus, Elaeocarpus, Nephelium, Bauhinia, Schima, Fagraea, Aeschynanthus and Magnoliaceae grow at elevations of about 3,000 ft (910 m). Altingia excelsa, Terminalia myriocarpa, Selaginella, Lysimachia, Impatiens and at least six Begonia species are among the flowering plants growing at elevations of about 5,000 ft (1,500 m). Albizia, Alnus, Ficus, Saurauia, Callicarpa arborea grow in selectively logged areas. Diverse bamboo species grow in all forest zones up to 12,000 ft (3,700 m). Alpine vegetation includes plum-flowered rhododendron (Rhododendron pruniflorum), Rhododendron selense, Primula sikkimensis, Gentiana sino-ornata and Saussurea gossypiphora.

Seventeen orchid species were recorded during expeditions in 1996 and 1997, including black orchid (Paphiopedilum wardii), ivory-colored cymbidium (Cymbidium eburneum), aloe-leafed cymbidium (Cymbidium aloifolium), Aerides falcata, Arundina graminifolia, Bulbophyllum odoratissimum, Dendrobium hercoglossum, charming dendrobium (Dendrobium pulchellum), pinecone-like raceme dendrobium (Dendrobium thyrsiflorum) and Phaius tankervilleae.

=== Mammals ===
During expeditions in 1996 and 1997, a new muntjac species, the leaf muntjac (Muntiacus putaoensis), was discovered in lowland forest of Hkakaborazi Protected Area. Local hunters reported blue sheep (Pseudois nayaur), red serow (Capricornis rubidus) and takin (Budorcas taxicolor) to occur in the foothills of Hkakabo Razi mountain. Red goral (Naemorhedus baileyi) was sighted. During surveys between May 2002 and May 2003, Indian muntjac (Muntiacus muntjac), leaf muntjac, wild boar (Sus scrofa), mainland serow (Capricornis milneedwardsii), stump-tailed macaque (Macaca arctoides), rhesus macaque (M. mulatta), capped langur (Trachypithecus pileatus), western hoolock gibbon (Hoolock hoolock), Malayan porcupine (Hystrix brachyura), brush-tailed porcupine (Atherurus macrourus), Asiatic golden cat (Catopuma temminkii), sun bear (Helarctos malayanus), dhole (Cuon alpinus), binturong (Arctictis binturong), masked palm civet (Paguma larvata), hog badger (Arctonyx collaris) and orange-bellied Himalayan squirrel (Dremomys lokriah) were recorded.

Wildlife recorded during camera trapping surveys in 2003 and 2004 comprised yellow-throated marten (Martes flavigula), spotted linsang (Prionodon pardicolor), Chinese ferret-badger (Melogale moschata), clouded leopard (Neofelis nebulosa), marbled cat (Pardofelis marmorata) and leopard cat (Prionailurus bengalensis).

=== Birds ===
Among the 160 bird species sighted during a survey in spring 1997 were crested serpent eagle (Spilornis cheela), Indian paradise flycatcher (Terpsiphone paradisi), Kalij pheasant (Lophura leucomelanos), Himalayan monal (Lophophorus impejanus), rufous-necked hornbill (Aceros nipalensis), great hornbill (Buceros bicornis), wreathed hornbill (Rhyticeros undulatus), Oriental pied hornbill (Anthracoceros albirostris), great barbet (Psilopogon virens), golden-throated barbet (P. franklinii), blue-throated barbet (P. asiaticus), ibisbill (Ibidorhyncha struthersii), rosy minivet (Pericrocotus roseus), scarlet minivet (P. speciosus), red-whiskered bulbul (Pycnonotus jocosus), common emerald dove (Chalcophaps indica), rufous treepie (Dendrocitta vagabunda), red-headed trogon (Harpactes erythrocephalus), maroon oriole (Oriolus traillii), Asian fairy-bluebird (Irena puella), golden babbler (Cyanoderma chrysaea), rusty-naped pitta (Hydrornis oatesi) and purple sunbird (Cinnyris asiaticus). In 2005, the Naung Mung scimitar babbler (Jabouilleia naungmungensis) was described based on three zoological specimens collected southwest of Hkakaborazi National Park in disturbed primary forest at an elevation of 1,770 ft (540 m).
