= Gongshan muntjac =

Conservation status
- Data Deficient (IUCN 3.1)

Scientific classification
- Kingdom: Animalia
- Phylum: Chordata
- Class: Mammalia
- Order: Artiodactyla
- Family: Cervidae
- Genus: Muntiacus
- Species: M. gongshanensis

Binomial name
- Muntiacus gongshanensis Ma, 1990
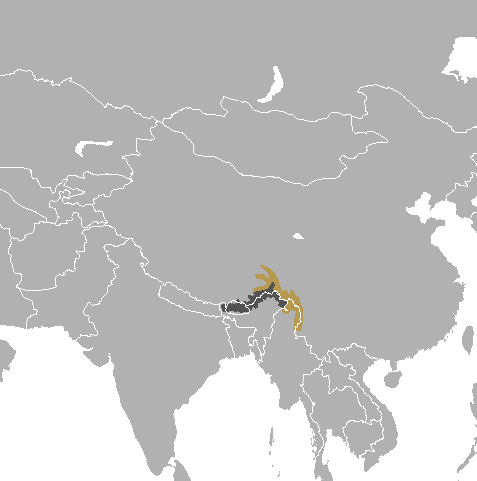

Species of deer

The Gongshan muntjac (Muntiacus gongshanensis) is a species of muntjac (a type of deer) living in the Gongshan mountains in northwestern Yunnan, southeast Tibet, Northeast India (especially in Arunachal Pradesh) and northern Myanmar.

== Taxonomy ==
Genetic studies have shown it to be very closely related to the hairy-fronted muntjac, possibly close enough to be considered the same species despite different coloration, though this position is disputed. References of occurrence of the hairy-fronted muntjac Muntiacus crinifrons in Arunachal Pradesh are actually Gongshan muntjac.

== Description ==
This species is a moderately sized muntjac, smaller than populations of the northern red muntjac.

The tail is dark brown dorsally and relatively long, with a broad white fringe. The crown, ear bases and the top of the frontal area are orange brown, with dark brown to blackish frontal stripes. The body is generally a rich dark brown, and the throat, mid-ventral neck and underparts are slightly paler.

The deer in the Gaoligongshan National Nature Reserve have pronounced lateral tufts in the female and a diffuse darker line dividing the crown. Deer from Myanmar have much larger tufts than the deer in Yunnan, and they also have a shorter crown tuft. Deer from Dibang Valley district in India are similar to the deer in Myanmar, and the deer from Tibet appear to be larger.

Distinguishing this species from congeners in the field is difficult, especially if the dark tail is not seen. Deer from Myanmar, especially darker specimens, are similar to the northern red muntjac, except for the dorsal tail color. Smaller specimens are similar to the leaf muntjac, but differ in the tail color and the overall body coloration.

== Distribution and Habitat ==
While the population cannot be accurately counted, they are often seen on camera-trapping studies which suggest a population well above being endangered. Gongshan Muntjacs have been observed within two large protected areas in Myanmar, Khakaborazi National Park and the Hponkanrazi Wildlife Sanctuary.

Little is known about this species' habitat, but records have been found from a wide altitudinal range, spanning atleast 900-3000 m. This species occupies subtropical broadleaf evergreen, broadleaf temperate and coniferous forest.

== Threats ==
Ongoing hunting is a major threat to its survival.
