= Northern Indochina subtropical forests =

Ecoregion in Southeast Asia

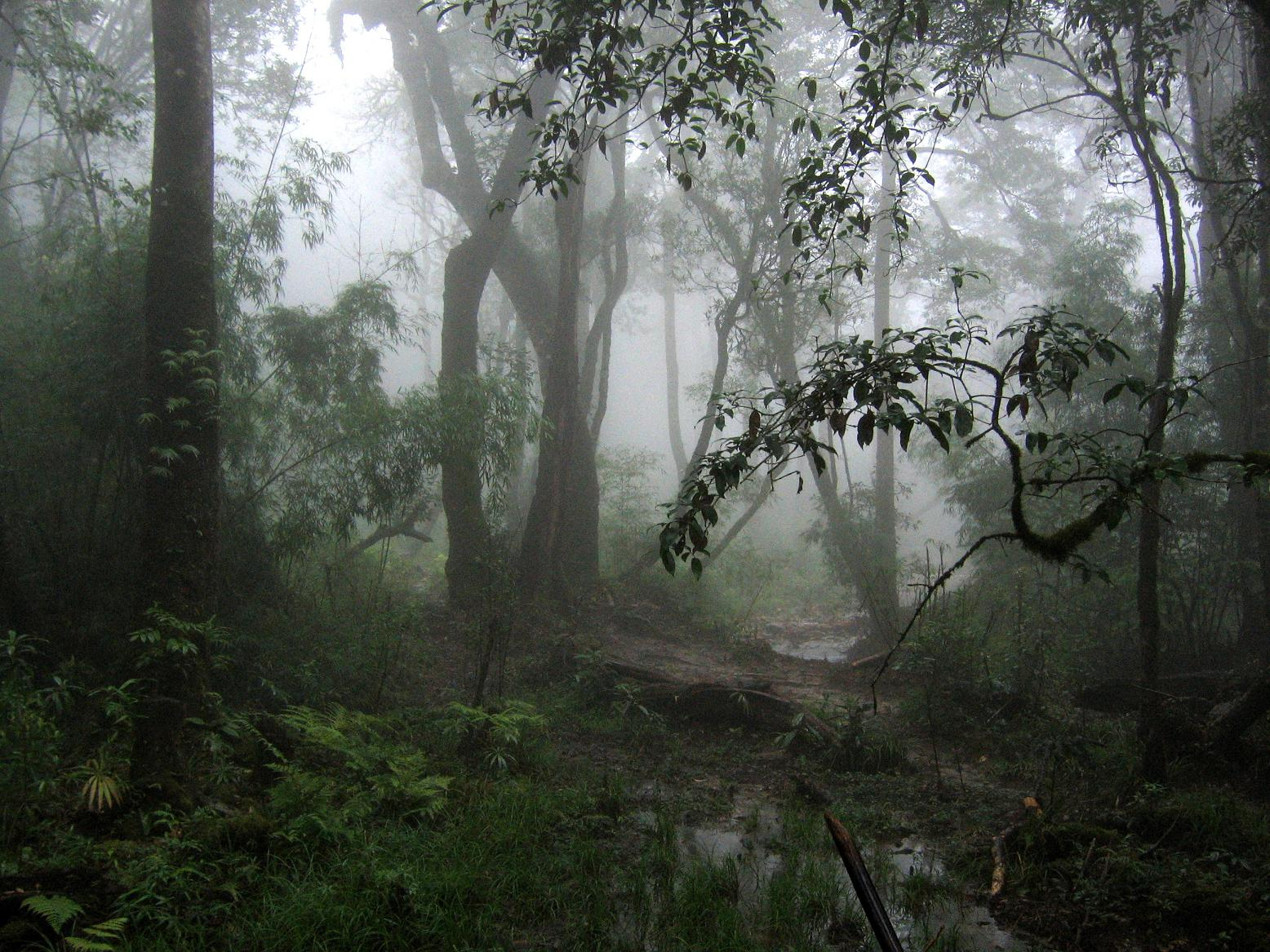
- Forest on Fansipan, Vietnam

- Map of the Northern Indochina subtropical moist forests ecoregion

Ecology
- Realm: Indomalayan
- Biome: tropical and subtropical moist broadleaf forests
- Borders: List: Central Indochina dry forests; Irrawaddy moist deciduous forests; Kayah–Karen montane rain forests; Luang Prabang montane rain forests; Mizoram–Manipur–Kachin rain forests; Northern Annamites rain forests; Northern Thailand–Laos moist deciduous forests; Northern Triangle subtropical forests; Northern Vietnam lowland rain forests; Nujiang Lancang Gorge alpine conifer and mixed forests; Red River freshwater swamp forests; Yunnan Plateau subtropical evergreen forests
- Bird species: 707
- Mammal species: 183

Geography
- Area: 677,350 km^{2} (261,530 mi^{2})
- Countries: List: China; Laos; Myanmar; Thailand; Vietnam

Conservation
- Conservation status: vulnerable
- Protected: 30,724 km^{2} (7%)

The Northern Indochina subtropical forests are a subtropical moist broadleaf forest ecoregion of northern Indochina, covering portions of Vietnam, Laos, Thailand, Myanmar, and China's Yunnan Province.

== Setting ==
The Northern Indochina subtropical forests occupy the highlands of northern Indochina, extending from northeastern Vietnam, where they cover the upper portion of the Red River watershed and the northern Annamite Range, across northern Laos, northernmost Thailand, and southeastern Yunnan to Shan State in eastern Myanmar. The ecoregion includes Fansipan (3,147 metres (10,325 ft)), Vietnam's highest mountain.

The Northern Indochina subtropical forests are a transition between the tropical forests of Indochina and the subtropical and temperate forests of Southern China and the Tibetan Plateau.

== Climate ==
The ecoregion has a subtropical monsoon climate. Rainfall is highly seasonal, falling mostly with the summer monsoon from the Bay of Bengal and South China Sea between April and October. From November to March westerly winds from continental Asia create cooler and dry conditions. January is the coldest month, and pre-monsoon spring temperatures are generally the hottest. Mean temperatures are generally lower as elevation increases, and infrequent frosts occur at higher elevations.

== Flora ==
The predominant plant community is subtropical broadleaf evergreen forest. These forests include a mix of subtropical plants common to the Himalayas and southern China, along with tropical lowland forest species. Mature forests form a three-layered canopy up to 30 metres (98 ft) high. Trees from the plant families Theaceae (Schima spp.), Magnoliaceae (Magnolia spp.), and Fagaceae (Quercus spp., Castanopsis spp., and Lithocarpus spp.) are predominant. Several kinds of trees from Dipterocarpaceae can also be found in this area, for example Parashorea chinensis, Dipterocarpus retusus, and Hopea mollissima. Other tree families represented are Betulaceae, Hamamelidaceae, Lauraceae, Sapotaceae, and Elaeocarpaceae.

Montane broadleaf evergreen forests occur from 600 to 800 metres (2,000 to 2,600 ft) elevation up to 2,000 m (6,600 ft) elevation. The subtropical montane species are predominant, and the tropical lowland species are absent. Deciduous broadleaf trees and conifers are found at higher elevations. Montane deciduous forests are found on the Shan Plateau of northern Myanmar.

On Fansipan in northern Vietnam, a distinct fir-hemlock forest grows above 2,000 m (6,600 ft) elevation, and is found nowhere else in Southeast Asia. The characteristic trees are the conifers Tsuga dumosa and Abies delavayi var. nukiangensis. The firs and hemlocks are accompanied by broadleaf trees of families Aceraceae, Hippocastanaceae, Fagaceae, Magnoliaceae, and Lauraceae, and conifers of Cupressaceae, Podocarpaceae, and Taxaceae.

Forests growing on limestone substrates have a distinct composition, with the trees Tetrameles nudiflora, Antiaris toxicaria, Celtis timorensis, C. philippensis, Cleistanthus sumatranus, Garuga floribunda, Pterospermum menglunense, Ulmus lanceifolia, and Xantolis stenosepala.

== Fauna ==
The ecoregion is home to over 183 species of mammals. They include the Asian elephant (Elephas maxiumus), tiger (Panthera tigris), Asian black bear (Ursus thibetanus), gaur (Bos gaurus), mainland serow (Capricornis sumatraensis milneedwardsii), banteng (Bos javanicus), clouded leopard (Pardofelis nebulosa), red panda (Ailurus fulgens), particoloured flying squirrel (Hylopetes alboniger), pygmy loris (Nycticebus pygmaeus), northern pig-tailed macaque (Macaca leonina), Assam macaque (Macaca assamensis), stump-tailed macaque (Macaca arctoides), dhole (Cuon alpinus), smooth-coated otter (Lutrogale perspicillata), back-striped weasel (Mustela strigidorsa), and inornate squirrel (Callosciurus inornatus).

The Tonkin snub-nosed monkey (Rhinopithecus avunculus), Roosevelt's muntjac (Muntiacus rooseveltorum), and Pu Hoat muntjac (Muntiacus puhoatensis) are mammals endemic to the ecoregion. Fea's muntjac (Muntiacus feae), Anderson's squirrel (Callosciurus quinquestriatus), Owston's palm civet (Chrotogale owstoni), the red-throated squirrel (Dremomys gularis), northern white-cheeked gibbon (Hylobates leucogenys), and Chaotung vole (Eothenomys olitor) are near-endemic mammals, native to the ecoregion and one or more adjacent ecoregions.

The ecoregion has 707 species of birds.

== Protected areas ==
A 2017 assessment estimated that 30,724 km^{2}, or 7%, of the ecoregion is in protected areas. Another 34% of ecoregion's area is forested but outside of protected areas. A 1997 assessment found a total of 15,948 km^{2} protected in 19 protected areas.

Protected areas include Doi Phachang Wildlife Sanctuary, Cúc Phương National Park, Ba Vì National Park, Hoàng Liên National Park, Xuân Sơn National Park, Bến En National Park, Mae Phang National Park, Phu Sang National Park, and Nam Et-Phou Louey National Park.
