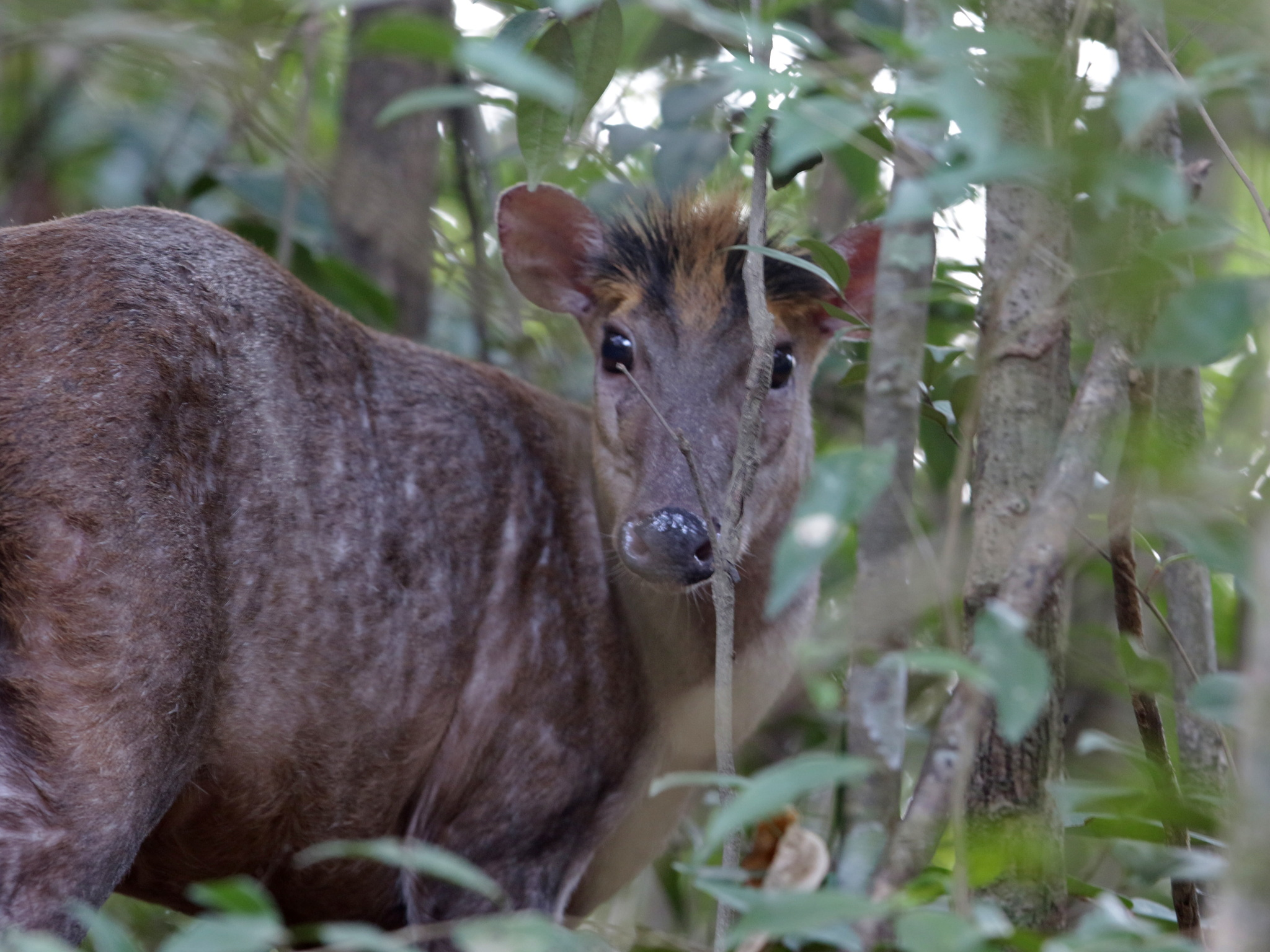

Conservation status
- Data Deficient (IUCN 3.1)

Scientific classification
- Kingdom: Animalia
- Phylum: Chordata
- Class: Mammalia
- Order: Artiodactyla
- Family: Cervidae
- Genus: Muntiacus
- Species: M. feae

Binomial name
- Muntiacus feae (Thomas & Doria, 1889)
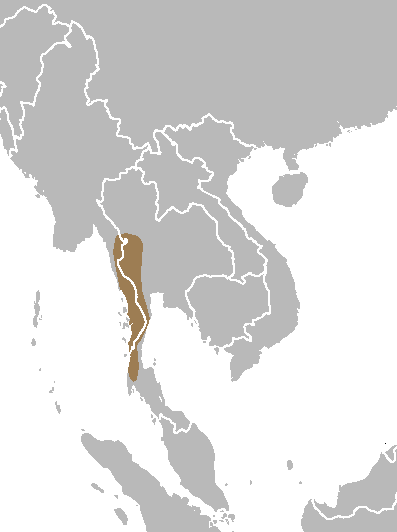

= Fea's muntjac =

Species of deer

Fea's muntjac (Muntiacus feae) also called the Tenasserim muntjac, is a species of muntjac native to southern Myanmar and Thailand.

== Morphology ==
Fea's muntjac has a brown, dark orange, or gray coat. The limbs and posterior tail are black. A lighter yellow-hued triangular patch extends down from the forehead with darker fur stretching from the muzzle to the orbital glands under the eyes. Two black lines extend down from the horns.

Fea's muntac weighs around 25kg. The holotype specimen (a male) was 88cm in length, not including the tail. It is larger and lighter in color than the Gongshan muntjac (Muntiacus gongshanensis), with which its range overlaps. It is similar in size to the red muntjac (Muntiacus vaginalis), with which it may also overlap but can be distinguished by its black tail.

== Distribution and ecology ==
Fea's muntjac lives along the border between Myanmar and Thailand. The species has also been observed in southwestern China and Tibet, however these veracity of these identifications have been called into question by the International Union for the Conservation of Nature (best known for creating the IUCN red list); the assessors note that many of the published reports predate the description of Muntiacus gongshanensis and suggest that that individuals from this then-unknown species may have been misidentified as M. feae.

There is limited data on the species' distribution, with most data derived from camera trap sightings. The species seems to occur predominantly in evergreen forests and is more prevalent in wetter than in drier forests.

Relatively little is known about the ecology of Fea's muntjac. Limited evidence has suggested that Fea's muntjac is generally solitary. It is known to feed on fruits and leaves but is likely omnivorous like others in its genus.

== Discovery and taxonomy ==
The holotype specimen was collected by Leonardo Fea, from whom it takes its name. The species was first discovered in the Tenasserim Hills of Myanmar (from which it derives its other common name).

Fea's muntjac was first described by the British zoologist Oldfield Thomas and the Italian naturalist Marquis Giacomo Doria in 1889 as Cervulus feae based on the preserved skin of Fea's specimen.

Thomas published a more detailed description of the type specimen, including measurements, three years later.

== Genetic analysis ==
Muntjacs as a group are of interest to cytogeneticists and evolutionary biologists due to their extremely variable chromosome numbers. This is thought to be due to fusion of chromosomes inherited from a common ancestor, with variable numbers of chromosomal fusions occurring in each species. The factors driving the unusual frequency of chromosomal fusion in muntjacs is not clear, though some studies have suggested that areas of repetitive DNA sequences located in centromeric and telomeric regions may facilitate recombination between non-homologous (i.e. non-paired) chromosomes.

Unusually the number of chromosomes present in Fea's muntjacs appears to differ between sexes within the species; a study of six muntjacs demonstrated that male Fea's muntjacs have 14 (2n=7) chromosomes while females have only thirteen; namely the X chromosome has fused with an autosome (a non-sex chromosome), while the Y chromosome has not.

The full genome of Fea's muntjac was sequenced in 2018. Genetic analysis has revealed that Fea's muntjac is most closely related to the hairy-fronted muntjac Muntiacus crinifrons and the Gongshan muntjac (Muntiacus gongshanensis).

Fea's muntjac is capable of hybridizing with the more common red muntjac, with at least one F_{1} hybrid being documented in captivity; the frequency with which this occurs in a natural setting is unknown.

A comparative genomic of analysis of Fea's muntjac and other cervid species demonstrated that the former had undergone an expansion of gene families associated with olfaction, suggesting possible selection for greater olfactory perception.

== Conservation ==
=== Threats ===
In a 2016 report the IUCN notes that that populations in Thailand, particularly those in higher elevations, would likely benefit from relative habitat stability and low hunting intensity; conversely those in Myanmar are more likely to be threatened by sustenance hunting, logging and the conversion of forest to agricultural land, in particular palm oil and rubber plantations.

Tanomtong et al. (2005) have has suggested that the frequent breakage and reunion of chromosomes in Fea's muntjac may lead to abnormalities in gametes, hindering the reproduction of the species.

=== Conservation status and efforts ===
The IUCN lists the conservation status of Fea's muntjac as data deficient given limited knowledge about its range and current numbers.

In 2019 the Thai government passed the most recent iteration of the Wild Animal Conservation and Protection Act designating Fea's muntjac as one of nineteen endangered "conserved animals" requiring special conservation efforts.

As of October 2025, there were fewer than three captive breeding pairs in Thailand. A genetic analysis of thirty-two captive individuals in Thailand demonstrated a high inbreeding coefficient compared to red muntjacs and wild cervid populations.

== Gallery ==
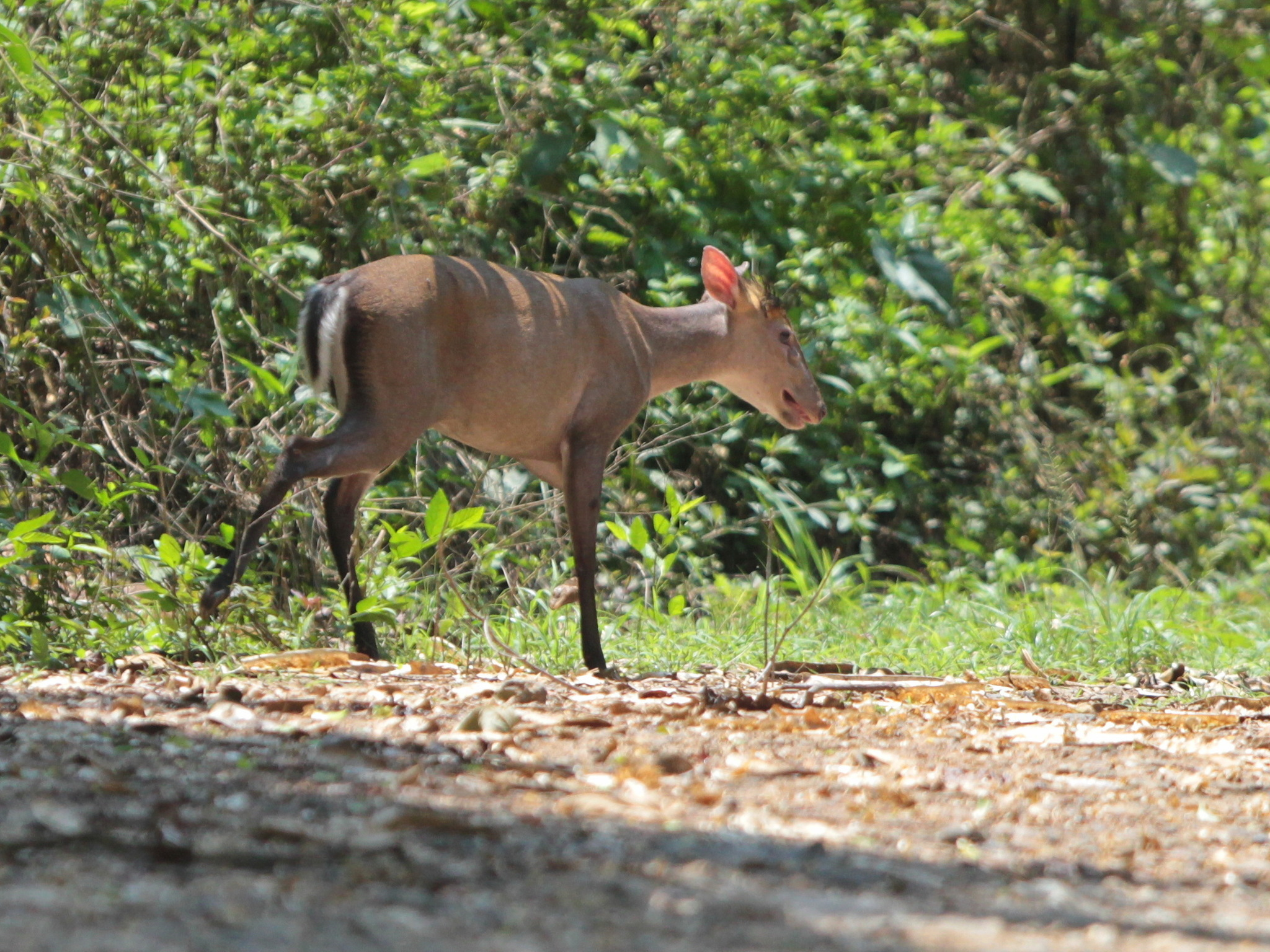
A Fea's muntjac from Phetchaburi Thailand - the black tail distinguishes it from the red muntjac

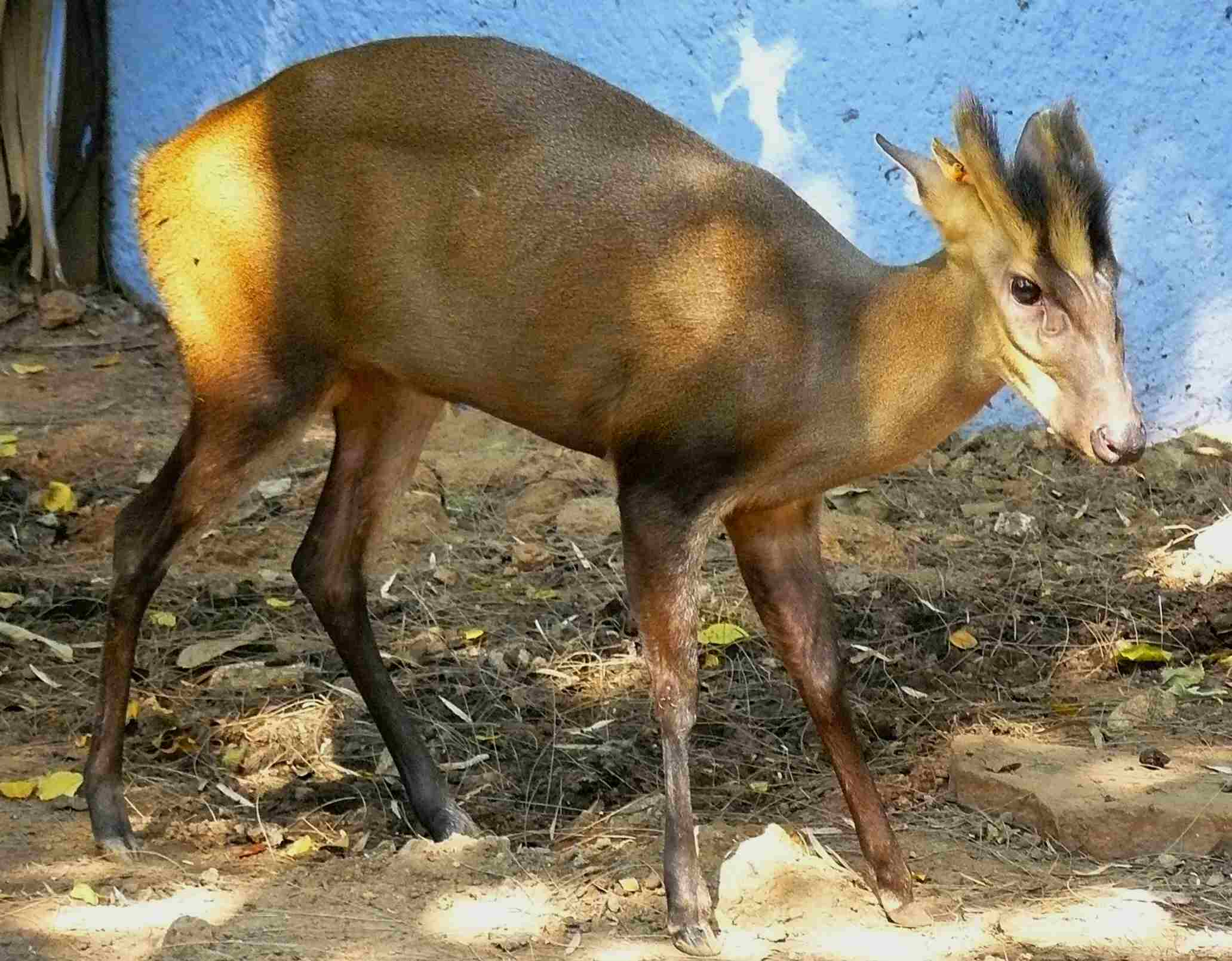
A Fea's muntjac at the Dusit Zoo in Bangkok Thailand

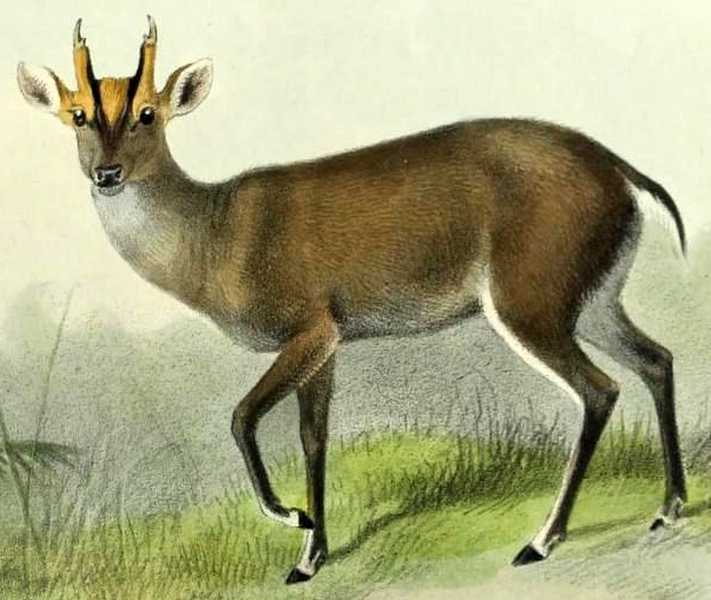
An illustration of Fea's muntjac in The Deer of All Lands (1898) depicting the species' distinctive facial markings.
Example 1
