= Red-throated squirrel =

Conservation status
- Data Deficient (IUCN 3.1)

Scientific classification
- Kingdom: Animalia
- Phylum: Chordata
- Class: Mammalia
- Order: Rodentia
- Family: Sciuridae
- Genus: Dremomys
- Species: D. gularis

Binomial name
- Dremomys gularis Osgood, 1932

Species of rodent

The red-throated squirrel (Dremomys gularis) is a rodent of the family Sciuridae. This species of rodent is distributed in parts of southeastern Asia, in areas of the Red River Valley of northern Vietnam and southern central Yunnan in China. The red-throated squirrel is sympatric with another member of the same genus, D. rufigenis, but lives at higher altitudes (2,500 to 3,000 m (8,200 to 9,800 ft) in the case of the type specimen).
