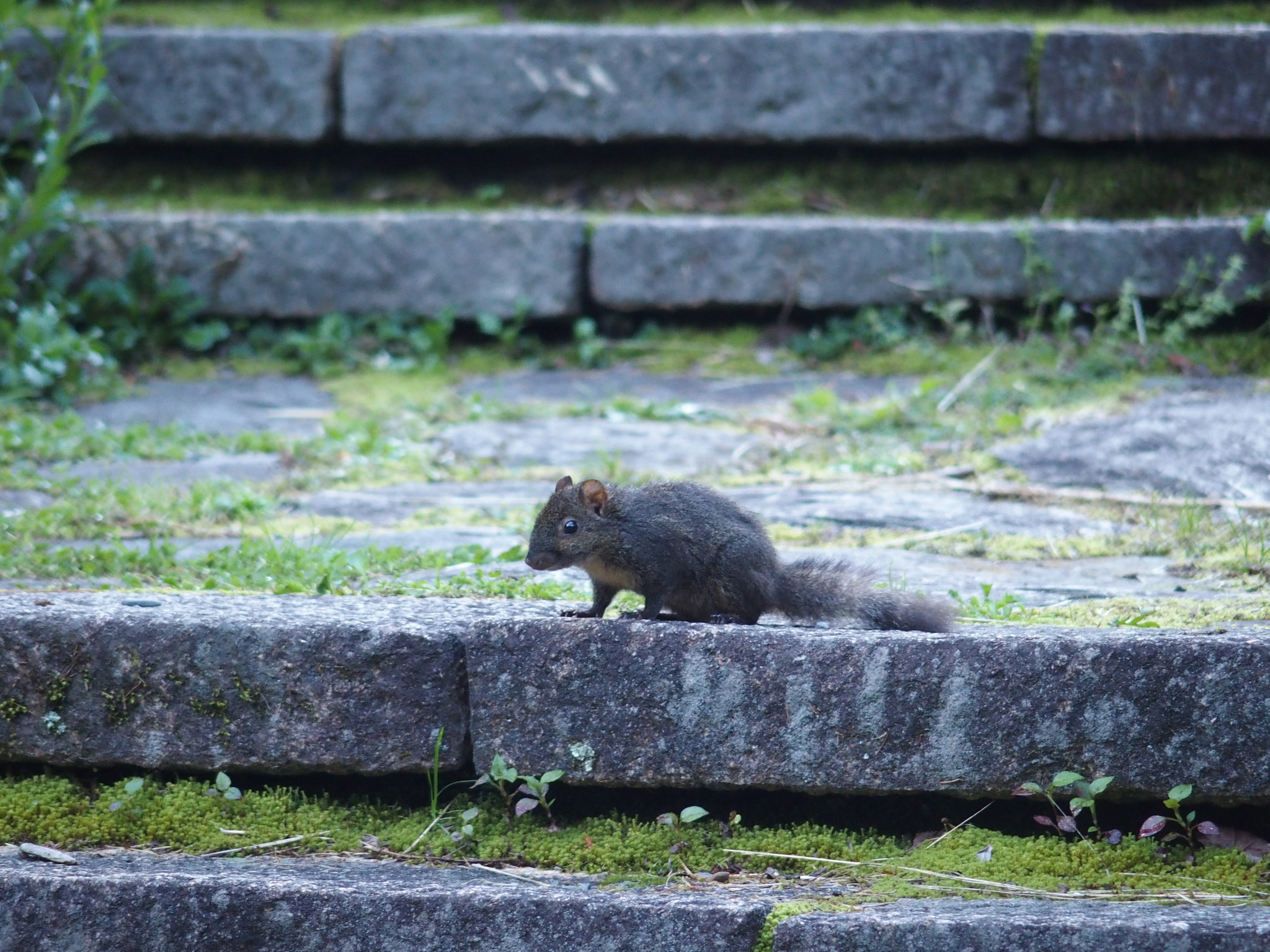
- In Yushan, Taiwan

Conservation status
- Least Concern (IUCN 3.1)

Scientific classification
- Kingdom: Animalia
- Phylum: Chordata
- Class: Mammalia
- Order: Rodentia
- Family: Sciuridae
- Genus: Dremomys
- Species: D. pernyi

Binomial name
- Dremomys pernyi (A. Milne-Edwards, 1867)
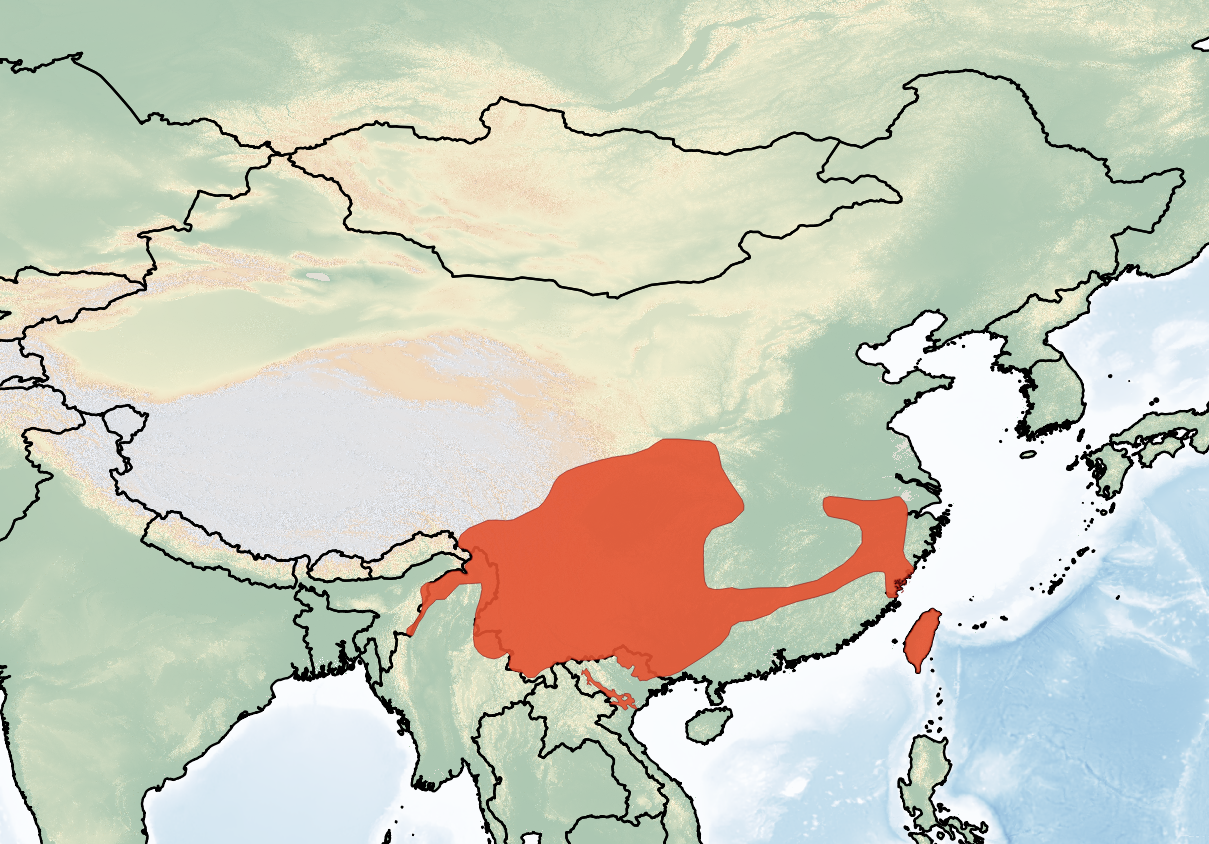

= Perny's long-nosed squirrel =

Species of rodent

Perny's long-nosed squirrel (Dremomys pernyi) is a species of rodent in the family Sciuridae. It is found in Northeast India, southern and central China, northern Myanmar, northern Vietnam, and Taiwan.
