= N'Gum La =

N'Gum La is a village located in the Northern Triangle of the Mali River and N'Mai River, in Kachin State, Burma. It is a village of about 66 households, controlled by the Kachin Independence Army (KIO) First Brigade. The climate is temperate an its economy is based on shifting cultivation.

The Triangle Area is populated by Kachins and some Nùngs. The Hka Hku (up-river) Kachins belong to the gumlao or republican type of community. N'Gum La High School, established in 1970, is also controlled by the KIO. It was burned by Burmese soldiers in 1987, rebuilt in 1986 in bamboo and thatch, and in 2005 with concrete. It is the oldest High school in the history of the Kachin Revolution.

The Northern Triangle area is one of the most biodiverse in the world. The Hkinduyang Valley is home to the hornbills, red pandas, red goral, takin, rare butterflies, and over 20 varieties of native orchids. including ground orchids.
