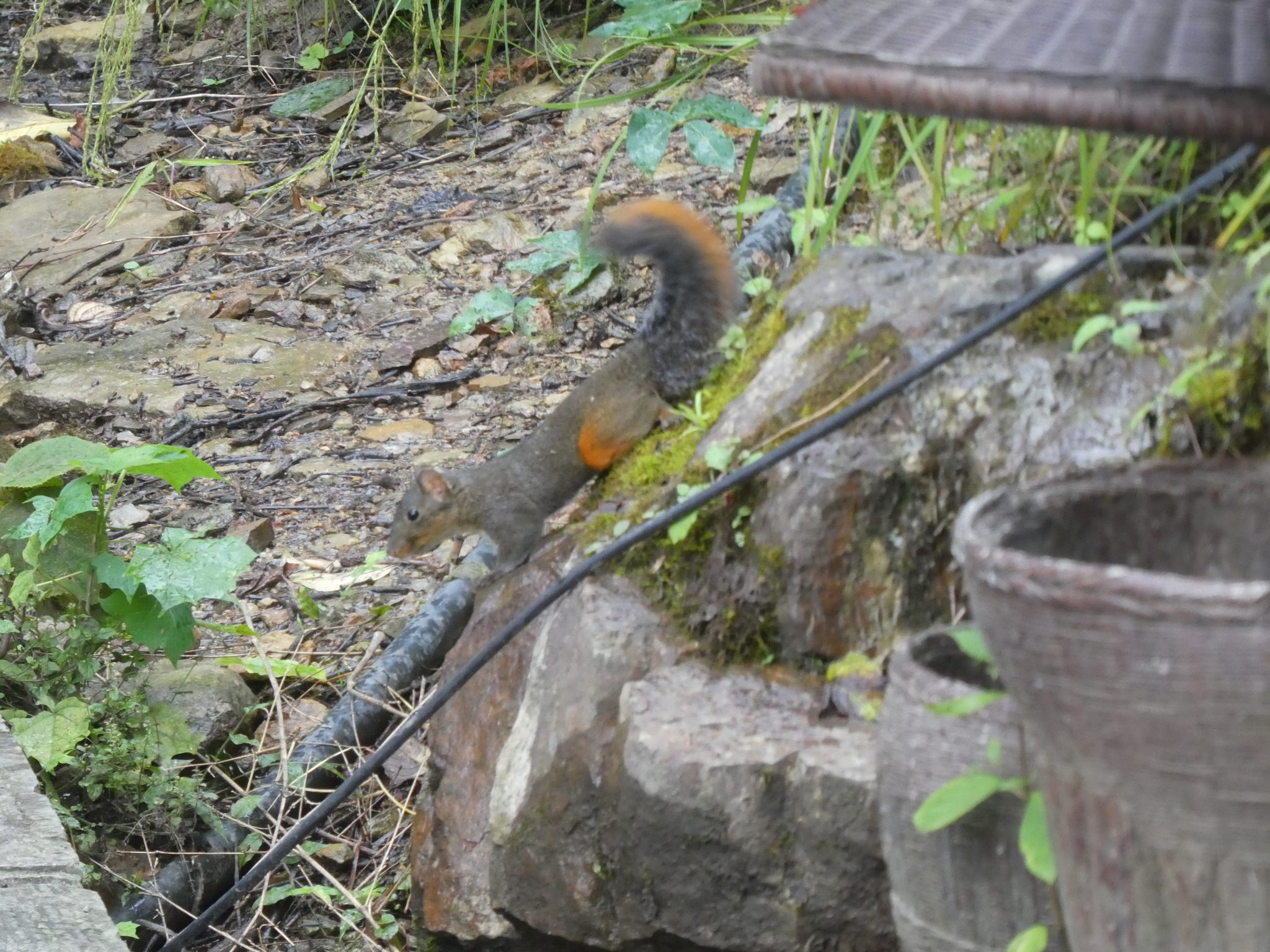
- In Hunan, China

Conservation status
- Least Concern (IUCN 3.1)

Scientific classification
- Kingdom: Animalia
- Phylum: Chordata
- Class: Mammalia
- Order: Rodentia
- Family: Sciuridae
- Genus: Dremomys
- Species: D. pyrrhomerus

Binomial name
- Dremomys pyrrhomerus (Thomas, 1895)

= Red-hipped squirrel =

Species of rodent

The red-hipped squirrel (Dremomys pyrrhomerus) is a species of rodent in the family Sciuridae. It is found in both China and Vietnam.
