= Hponkanrazi Wildlife Sanctuary =

Protected area in Myanmar

- IUCN category IV (habitat/species management area)
- Location within Myanmar
- Location: Kachin state, Myanmar
- Coordinates: 27.50°N 97.71°E
- Area: 2,703.95 km^{2} (1,044.00 sq mi)
- Established: 2003
- Governing body: Ministry of Natural Resources and Environmental Conservation, Forest Department

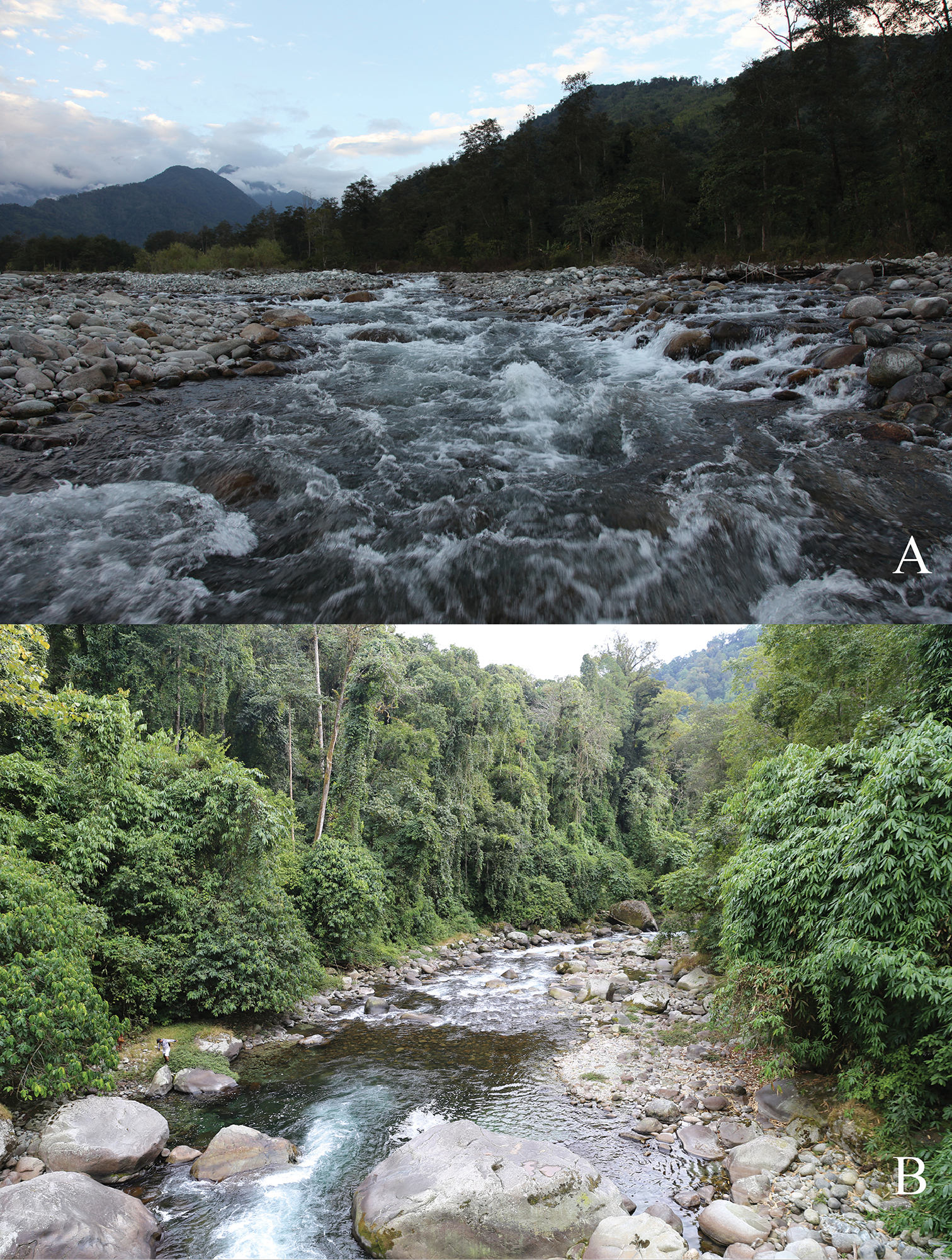
Two streams in Hponkanrazi Wildlife Sanctuary, A) Zeyar Stream, B) Monlar Stream; both are Mali Hka drainage

Hponkanrazi Wildlife Sanctuary is a protected area in northern Myanmar, stretching over an area of 2,703.95 km^{2} (1,044.00 sq mi). It was established in 2003. It encompasses riverine habitats, subtropical moist forest, temperate forest, deciduous forest and alpine forest. It is contiguous with Hkakaborazi National Park, Bumhpa Bum Wildlife Sanctuary and Hukaung Valley Wildlife Sanctuary. Together, they form a 30,269 km^{2} (11,687 sq mi) large protected area complex of natural forest called the Northern Forest Complex. It is managed by the Forest Department.

Wildlife recorded during camera trapping surveys between 2001 and 2005 comprised clouded leopard (Neofelis nebulosa), Asian golden cat (Catopuma temminckii), marbled cat (Pardofelis marmorata), leopard cat (Prionailurus bengalensis). yellow-throated marten (Martes flavigula) and spotted linsang (Prionodon pardicolor).
