= Nujiang Lancang Gorge alpine conifer and mixed forests =

Ecoregion in Southwestern China

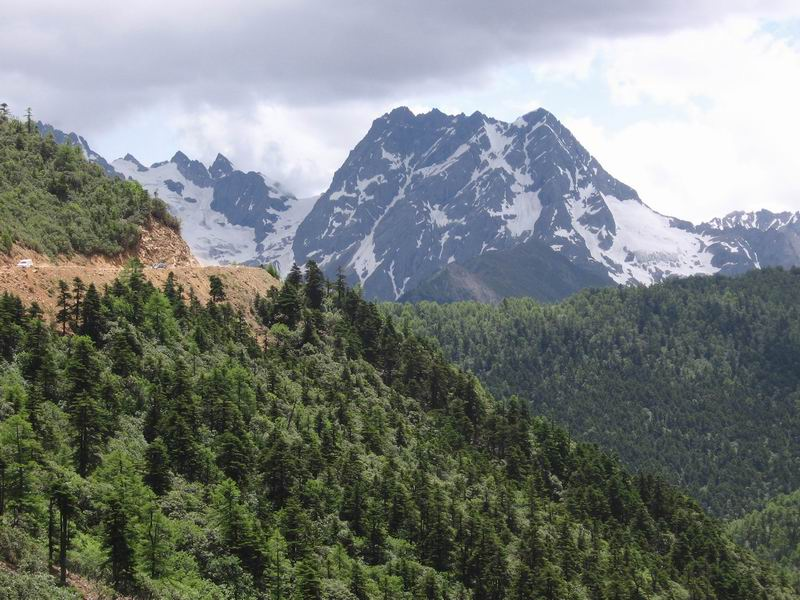
- Conifer and mixed forests in the Baima Mountains, a subrange of the Yun Range, in Deqin County

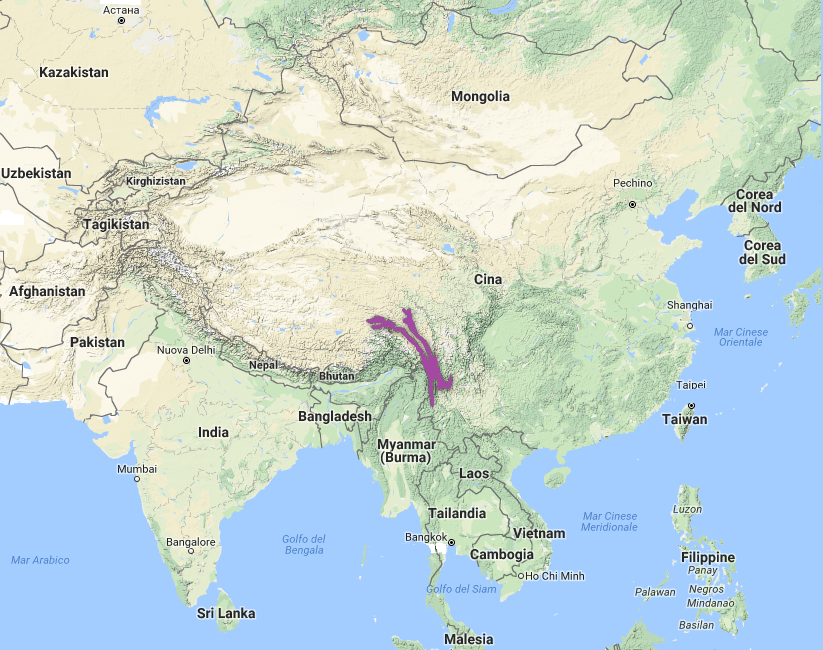
- Ecoregion territory (in purple)

Ecology
- Realm: Palearctic
- Biome: Temperate coniferous forests
- Borders: List: Eastern Himalayan alpine shrub and meadows; Hengduan Mountains subalpine conifer forests; Northern Indochina subtropical forests; Northern Triangle subtropical forests; Northern Triangle temperate forests; Southeast Tibet shrublands and meadows; Yunnan Plateau subtropical evergreen forests

Geography
- Area: 82,993 km^{2} (32,044 sq mi)
- Countries: China; Myanmar

Conservation
- Conservation status: critical/endangered
- Protected: 17.28%

The Nujiang Lancang Gorge alpine conifer and mixed forests are a temperate coniferous forests ecoregion in Southwest China and northeastern Myanmar. The forests cover mountains and valleys in the western Hengduan Mountains and because of the extreme topography and relative remoteness, remain one of the best preserved habitats in China.

== Geography ==
The Nujiang Lancang Gorge alpine conifer and mixed forests stretch from southern Qinghai and eastern Tibet Autonomous Region in the north to Yunnan Province in the south. Portions of the forests also extend into extreme western Sichuan (China) and eastern Kachin State (Myanmar). The primary physical features to support the Nujiang forests are the Nu (Salween) and Lancang (Mekong) River valleys from approximately 4,000 m (13,000 ft) elevation to 1,000 m (3,300 ft) elevation. The southern part of this ecoregion forms the core of the Three Parallel Rivers UNESCO World Heritage Site. In addition to the mountain valleys, the Nujiang Lancang Gorge alpine conifer and mixed forests are found across parts of the Hengduan Mountains including, from west to east, the Taniantaweng Mountains, the Gaoligong Mountains, the Nu Mountains, and the Yun Range.

== Flora and fauna ==
The mountains in this region of the Hengduan are steep and provide few opportunities for access between valleys and gorges. This has led to the isolated nature of these forests. Notable endangered and vulnerable species in the Nujiang Lancang Gorge alpine conifer and mixed forests include the Yunnan snub-nosed monkey (endemic to this ecoregion), Gaoligong pika, and Taiwania flousiana.

== Ecological threats ==
Forests in this ecoregion have long been threatened by logging, though since the 1990s the intensity of logging has declined in China. In the Myanmar portion, however, logging is still uncontrolled. Lower elevation sections of the Nujiang forests are threatened by hydroelectric projects harnessing the power of the wild rivers.

== Conservation ==
17.28% of the ecoregion is in protected areas. Protected areas in the ecoregion include Emawbum National Park, Hkakaborazi National Park, Lashihai Wetland, and Three Parallel Rivers of Yunnan Protected Areas.
