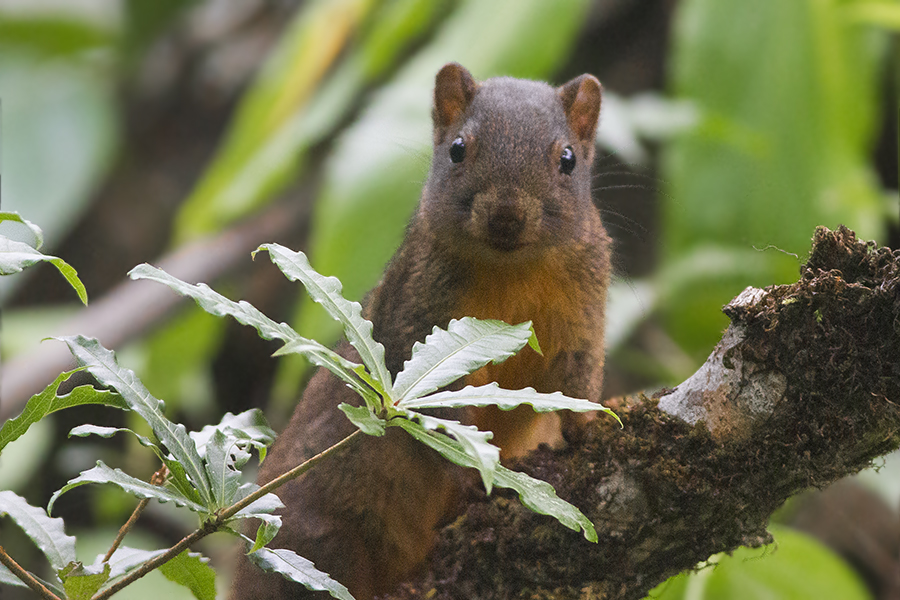
- Orange-bellied Himalayan squirrel (Dremomys lokriah)

Scientific classification
- Kingdom: Animalia
- Phylum: Chordata
- Class: Mammalia
- Infraclass: Placentalia
- Order: Rodentia
- Family: Sciuridae
- Subfamily: Callosciurinae
- Genus: Dremomys; Heude, 1898

Type species
- Sciurus pernyi A. Milne-Edwards, 1867

Species
- D. gularis Osgood, 1932; D. lokriah (Hodgson, 1836); D. pernyi (A. Milne-Edwards, 1867); D. pyrrhomerus (Thomas, 1895); D. rufigenis (Blanford, 1878)

= Red-cheeked squirrel =

Red-cheeked squirrels Temporal range: Early Pleistocene to Recent

Genus of rodents

Red-cheeked squirrels are species of squirrels in the genus Dremomys in the subfamily Callosciurinae. The six species which are all found only in Asia are listed as "Least Concern" by the IUCN.

- The red-throated squirrel (Dremomys gularis) is distributed in parts of southeastern Asia, in areas of the Red River Valley of northern Vietnam and southern central Yunnan in China. It is sympatric with another member of the same genus, D. rufigenis, but lives at higher attitudes - 2,500 to 3,000 metres (1.6 to 1.9 mi) in the case of the type specimen.
- The orange-bellied Himalayan squirrel (Dremomys lokriah) is found in Bangladesh, China, India, Myanmar, Nepal and Bhutan.
- Perny's long-nosed squirrel (Dremomys pernyi) is found in China, India, Myanmar, Taiwan, and Vietnam.
- The red-hipped squirrel (Dremomys pyrrhomerus) is found in China and Vietnam.
- The Asian red-cheeked squirrel (Dremomys rufigenis) is found in Cambodia, China, India, Laos, Malaysia, Myanmar, Thailand, and Vietnam.

The Bornean mountain ground squirrel (formerly Dremomys everetti), found in Indonesia and Malaysia, was moved from this genus to Sundasciurus.
