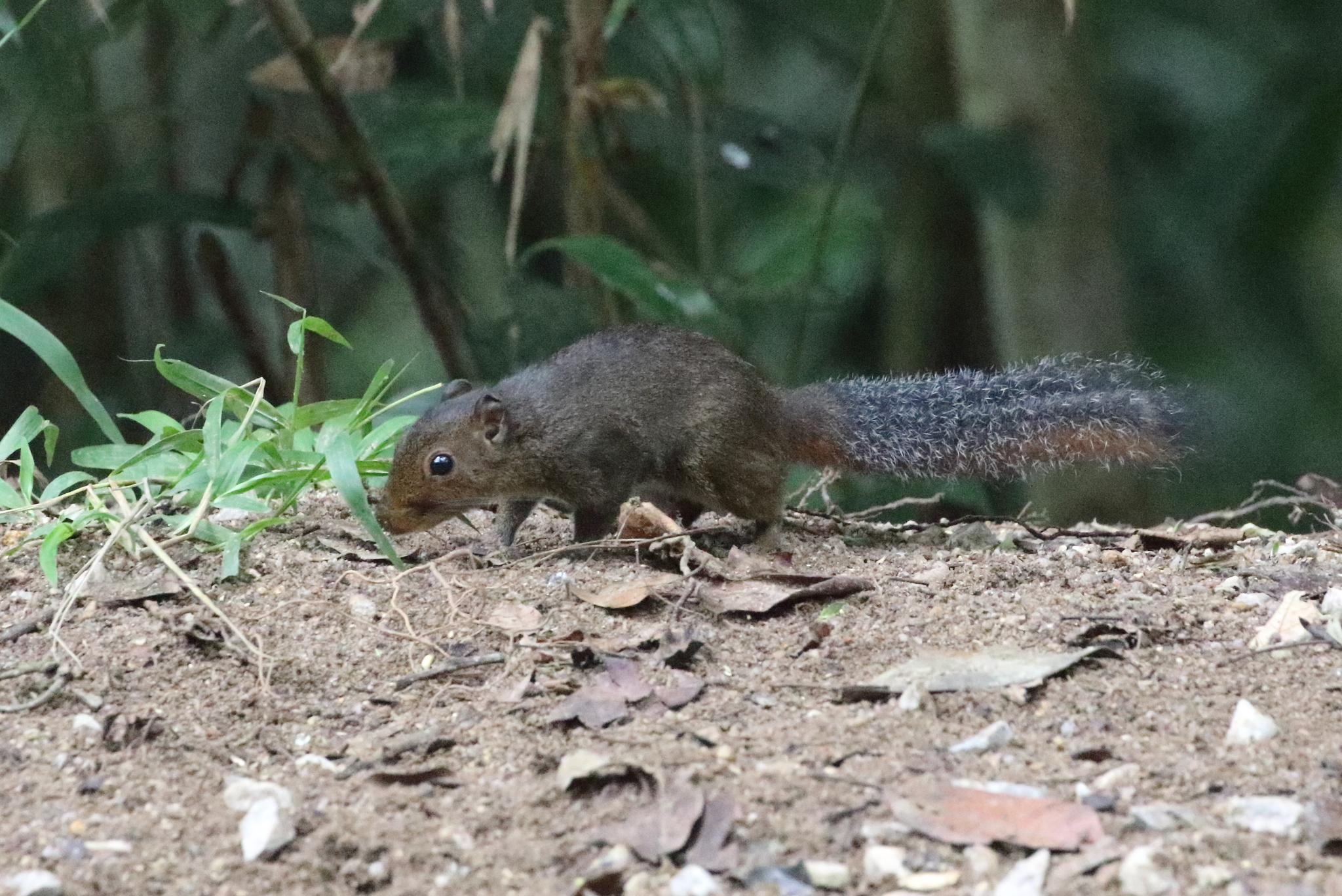
- In Fraser's Hill, Malaysia

Conservation status
- Least Concern (IUCN 3.1)

Scientific classification
- Kingdom: Animalia
- Phylum: Chordata
- Class: Mammalia
- Order: Rodentia
- Family: Sciuridae
- Genus: Dremomys
- Species: D. rufigenis

Binomial name
- Dremomys rufigenis (Blanford, 1878)
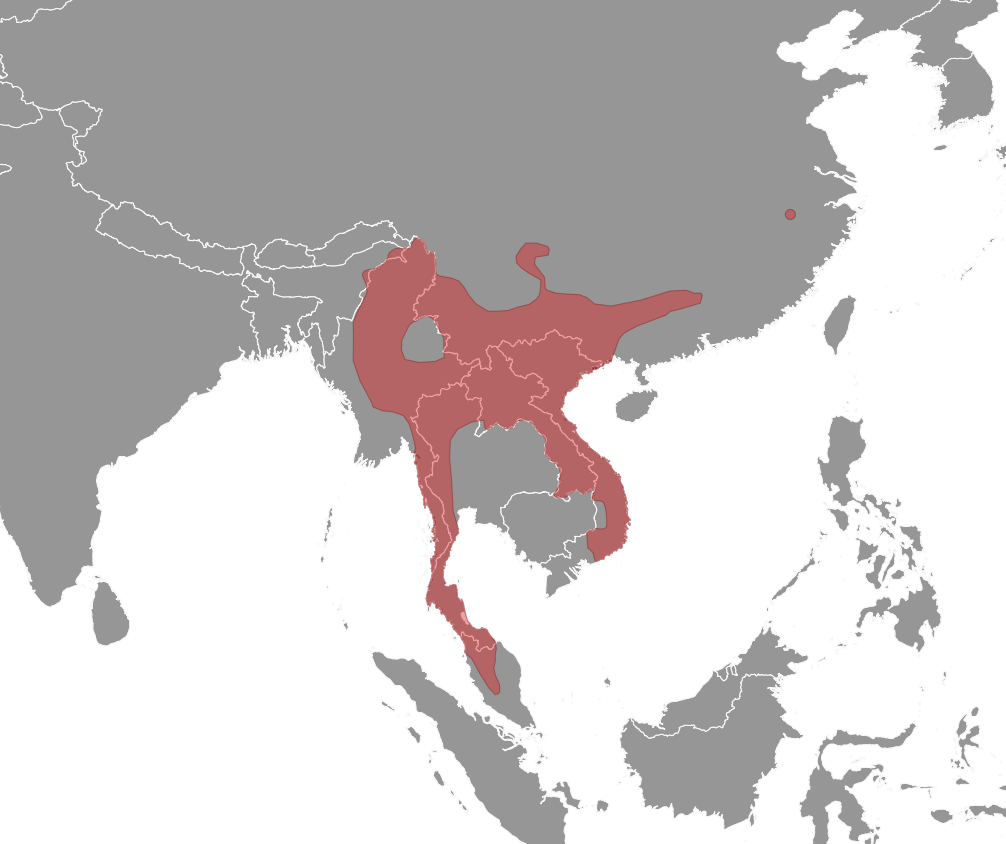

= Asian red-cheeked squirrel =

Species of rodent

The Asian red-cheeked squirrel (Dremomys rufigenis) is a species of rodent in the family Sciuridae. It is found in south-eastern Asia.
