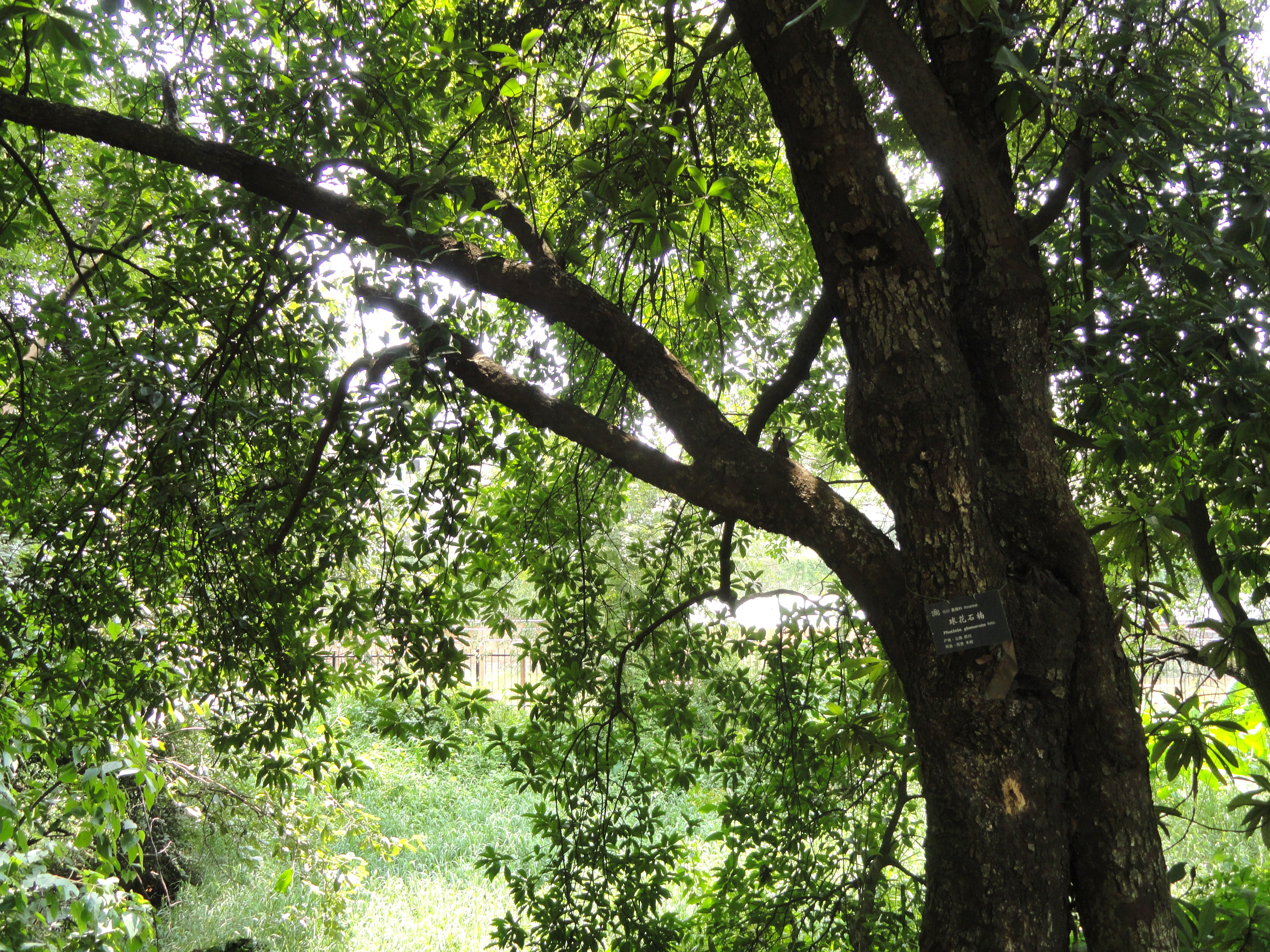

Scientific classification
- Kingdom: Plantae
- Clade: Tracheophytes
- Clade: Angiosperms
- Clade: Eudicots
- Clade: Rosids
- Order: Rosales
- Family: Rosaceae
- Genus: Photinia
- Species: P. glomerata

Binomial name
- Photinia glomerata Rehder & E.H.Wilson

= Photinia glomerata =

Species of flowering plant

Photinia glomerata is a species in the family Rosaceae.
