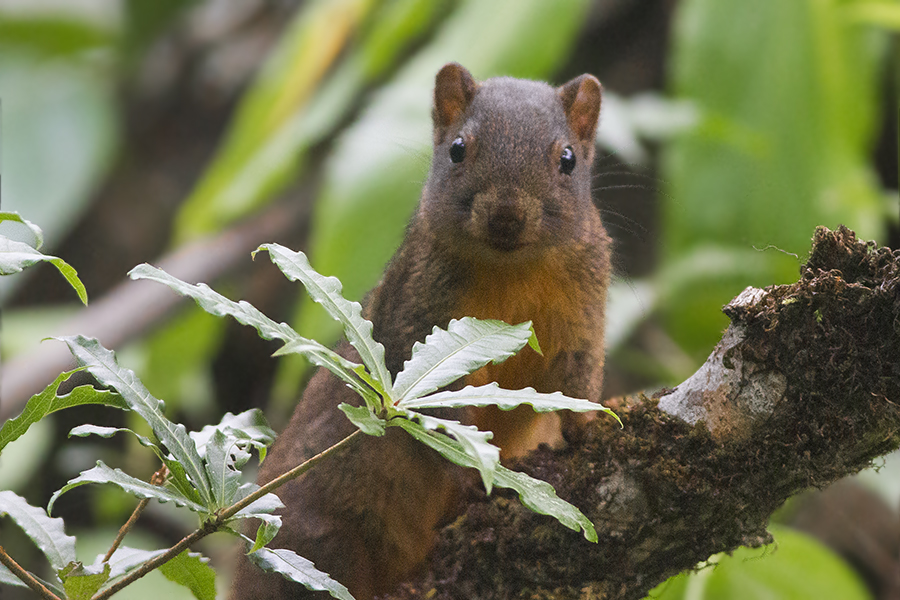
- From Khangchendzonga Biosphere Reserve in West Sikkim, India.

Conservation status
- Least Concern (IUCN 3.1)

Scientific classification
- Kingdom: Animalia
- Phylum: Chordata
- Class: Mammalia
- Order: Rodentia
- Family: Sciuridae
- Genus: Dremomys
- Species: D. lokriah

Binomial name
- Dremomys lokriah (Hodgson, 1836)
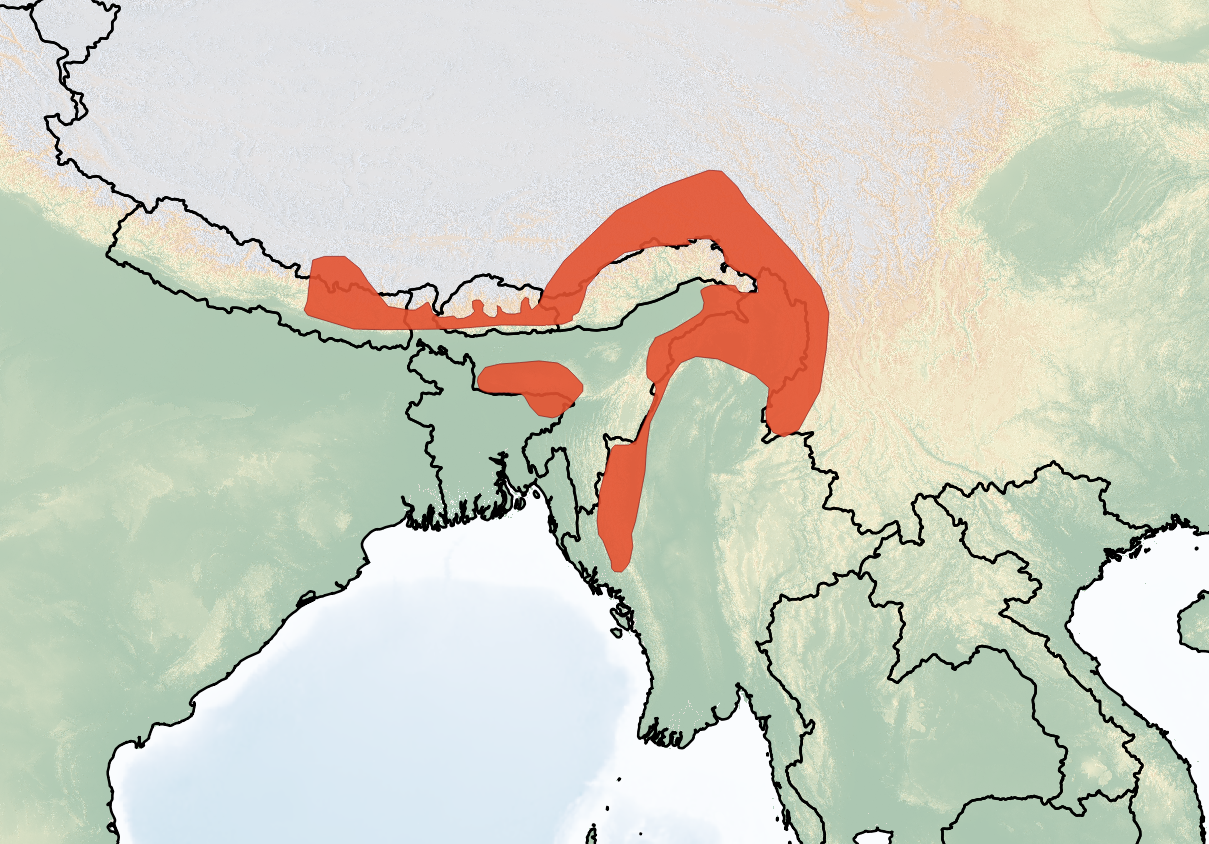

= Orange-bellied Himalayan squirrel =

Species of rodent

The orange-bellied Himalayan squirrel (Dremomys lokriah) is a species of rodent in the family Sciuridae. It is found in Bangladesh, China, India, Myanmar, Nepal and Bhutan.

== Taxonomy ==
The species was first described as Sciurus lokriah by Hodgson in the year 1836. He collected the specimens from the South Tibet region of Mount Everest. In 1916, Thomas and Wroughton described a species from the Manipur, India and Chin Hills as D. macmillani. Later that year, Wroughton also described a subspecies of D. lokriah as D. l. bhotia from the specimens collected from sedochen of Sikkim Himalaya, and Manipur. Thomas in 1922 described two more subspecies, D. l. garonum from Garo Hills, Meghalaya and D. l. subflaviventris from Mishmi Hills, Arunachal Pradesh, India. Moore in 1956 described D. l. pagus from the specimens collected from Chin Hills, Myanmar and Lushai Hills, Mizoram, India. Cai and Zhang in 1980 described another subspecies D. l. motuoensis and Li and Wang described D. l. nielamuensis in 1992 from China.

Although subspecies of D. lokriah has gone though several revisions, presently, there are total eight known valid subspecies of the Orange-bellied Himalayan Squirrel exists throughout its distribution range. Six of them are distributed in India. All of the validations of these subspecies were however through morpho-taxonomy and multivariate analysis. Molecular studies on the validation of these subspecies are still to be performed.

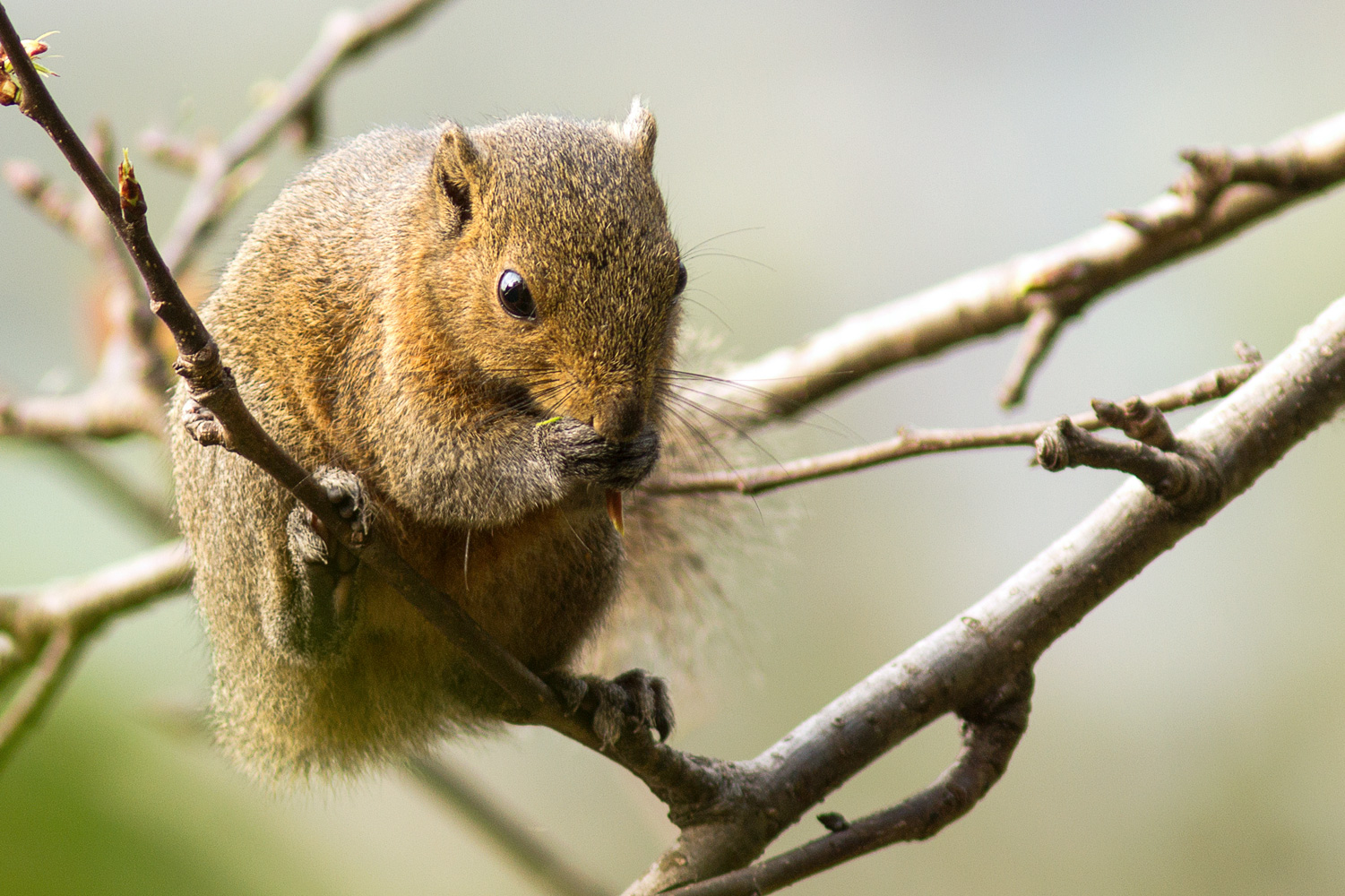
Orange bellied Himalayan Squirrel at Gangtok, Sikkim, India
