= Sinolimprichtia =

Scientific classification
- Kingdom: Plantae
- Clade: Tracheophytes
- Clade: Angiosperms
- Clade: Eudicots
- Clade: Asterids
- Order: Apiales
- Family: Apiaceae
- Subfamily: Apioideae
- Genus: Sinolimprichtia; H.Wolff
- Species: S. alpina

Binomial name
- Sinolimprichtia alpina H.Wolff

Species of flowering plant

Sinolimprichtia is a monotypic genus of flowering plants belonging to the family Apiaceae. It just contains one species, Sinolimprichtia alpina.

It is native to Tibet and southern central China (in the provinces of Sichuan and Yunnan).

The genus name of Sinolimprichtia is in honour of Hans Wolfgang Limpricht (b. 1877), a German botanist who collected plants in China and Japan. The Latin specific epithet of alpina refers to 'alpine' meaning coming from the Alps or mountains. It was first described and published in Repert. Spec. Nov. Regni Veg. Beih. Vol.12 on pages 448-449 in 1922.

It has 2 known subspecies;

- Sinolimprichtia alpina var. alpina
- Sinolimprichtia alpina var. dissecta R.H.Shan & S.L.Liou
