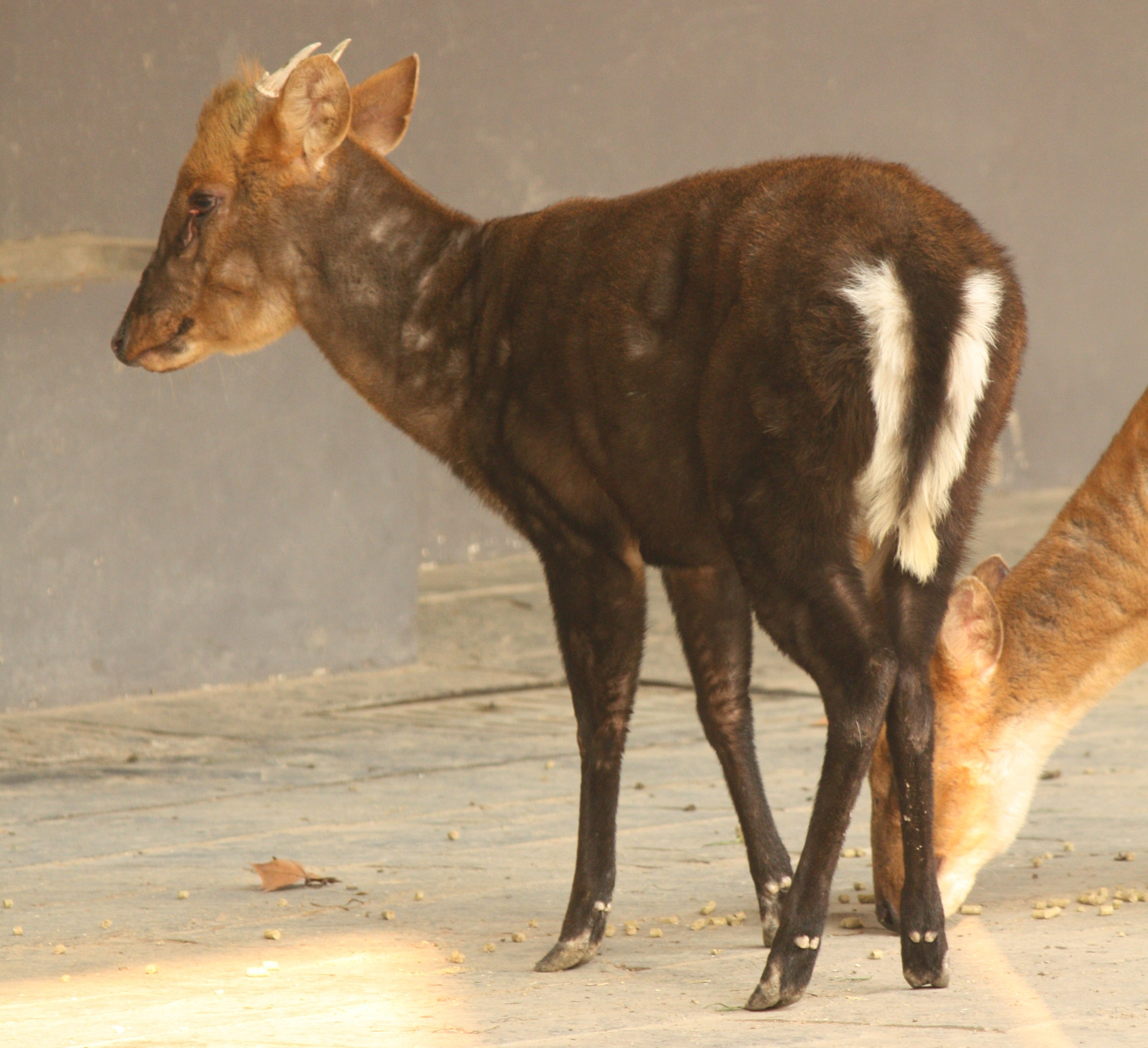

Conservation status
- Vulnerable (IUCN 3.1)
- CITES Appendix I (CITES)

Scientific classification
- Kingdom: Animalia
- Phylum: Chordata
- Class: Mammalia
- Order: Artiodactyla
- Family: Cervidae
- Genus: Muntiacus
- Species: M. crinifrons

Binomial name
- Muntiacus crinifrons (Sclater, 1885)

= Hairy-fronted muntjac =

Species of deer

The hairy-fronted muntjac or black muntjac (Muntiacus crinifrons) is a type of deer currently found in Zhejiang, Anhui, Jiangxi and Fujian in southeastern China. It is considered to be endangered, possibly down to as few as 5–10,000 individuals spread over a wide area. Reports of hairy-fronted muntjacs from Burma result from considering the hairy-fronted muntjac and Gongshan muntjac as the same species. This suggestion is controversial. It is similar in size to the common muntjac.

Hairy-fronted muntjacs are extremely difficult to study because of their shyness. Camera-trap photographs have revealed the presence of hairy-fronted muntjacs where they were believed not to have existed for decades, for example in the Wuyanling National Nature Reserve.

This species was for a very long time one of the most poorly known deer in the world. It was also considered highly endangered; up to 1975, it was only known from a few museum specimens, at least to western scientists. The species has been heavily hunted throughout the 20th century and in 1978 alone at least 2,000 animals were killed. The current population in China was assessed in the early 1990s to be about 10,000 individuals, however it has declined much since and the current population is likely to be well under 7,000.

The X and Y chromosomes of the hairy-fronted muntjac are very different from other therians, and represent an early stage in the evolution of a new sex-determination system. Females have chromosome number 2n = 8, while males have 2n = 9. A recent chromosomal rearrangement, within the past 500,000 years, fused the X with one of the autosomes (corresponding to chromosome 4 in other muntjacs) to form an expanded "neo-X". The other chromosome 4 fused with the short arm of chromosome 1 to form the extra male-specific "neo-Y" chromosome, which is passed down alongside the usual Y; the other chromosome 1 pairs with the detached long arm of its homolog. The neo-Y, which does not recombine, shows the accelerated mutation rate that is observed on the ordinary Y of other mammals.

== See also ==
- List of endangered and protected species of China
