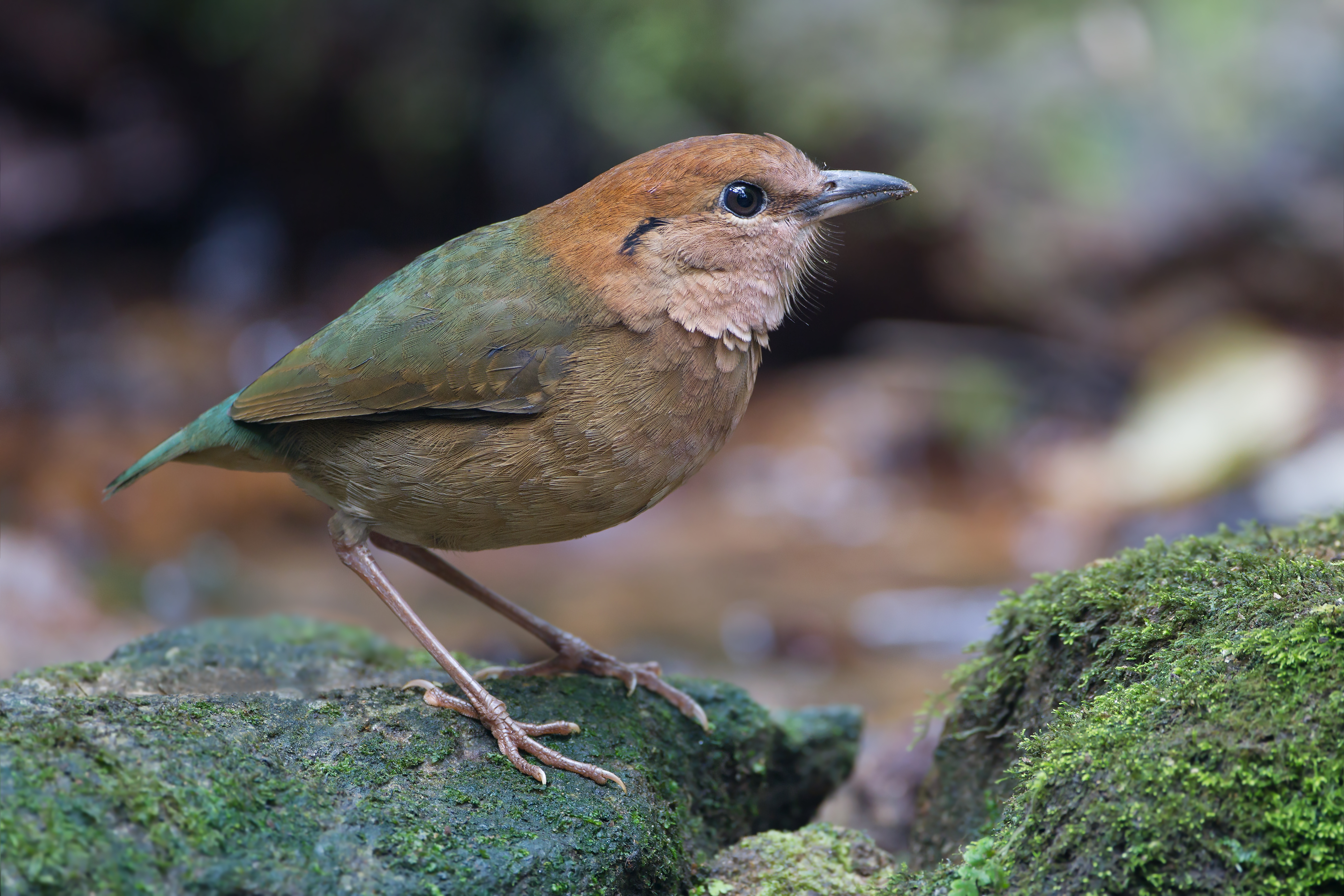

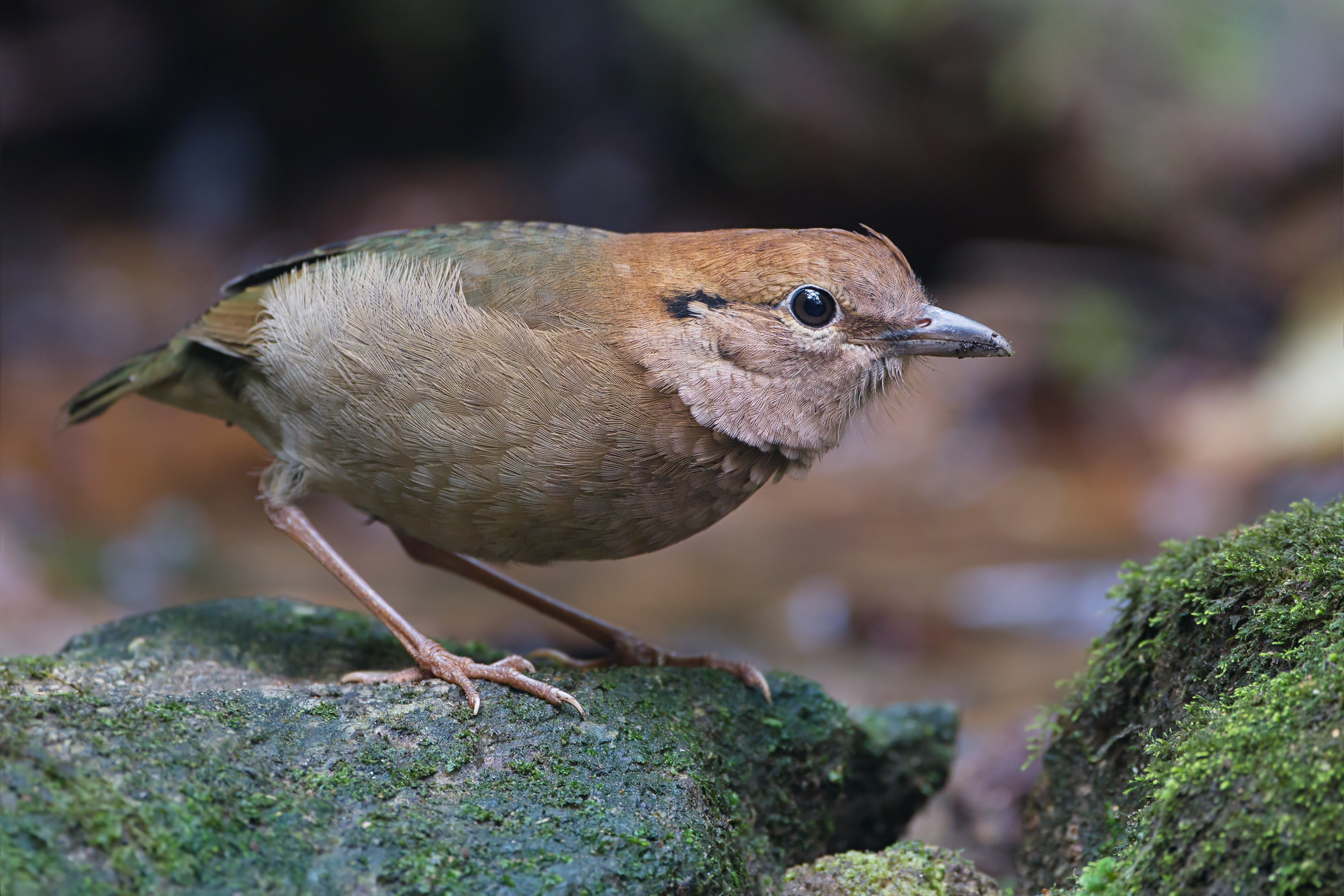
- Male and female

Conservation status
- Least Concern (IUCN 3.1)

Scientific classification
- Kingdom: Animalia
- Phylum: Chordata
- Class: Aves
- Order: Passeriformes
- Family: Pittidae
- Genus: Hydrornis
- Species: H. oatesi

Binomial name
- Hydrornis oatesi Hume, 1873

Synonyms
- Pitta oatesi

= Rusty-naped pitta =

Species of bird

The rusty-naped pitta (Hydrornis oatesi) is a species of bird in the family Pittidae.

== Taxonomy ==
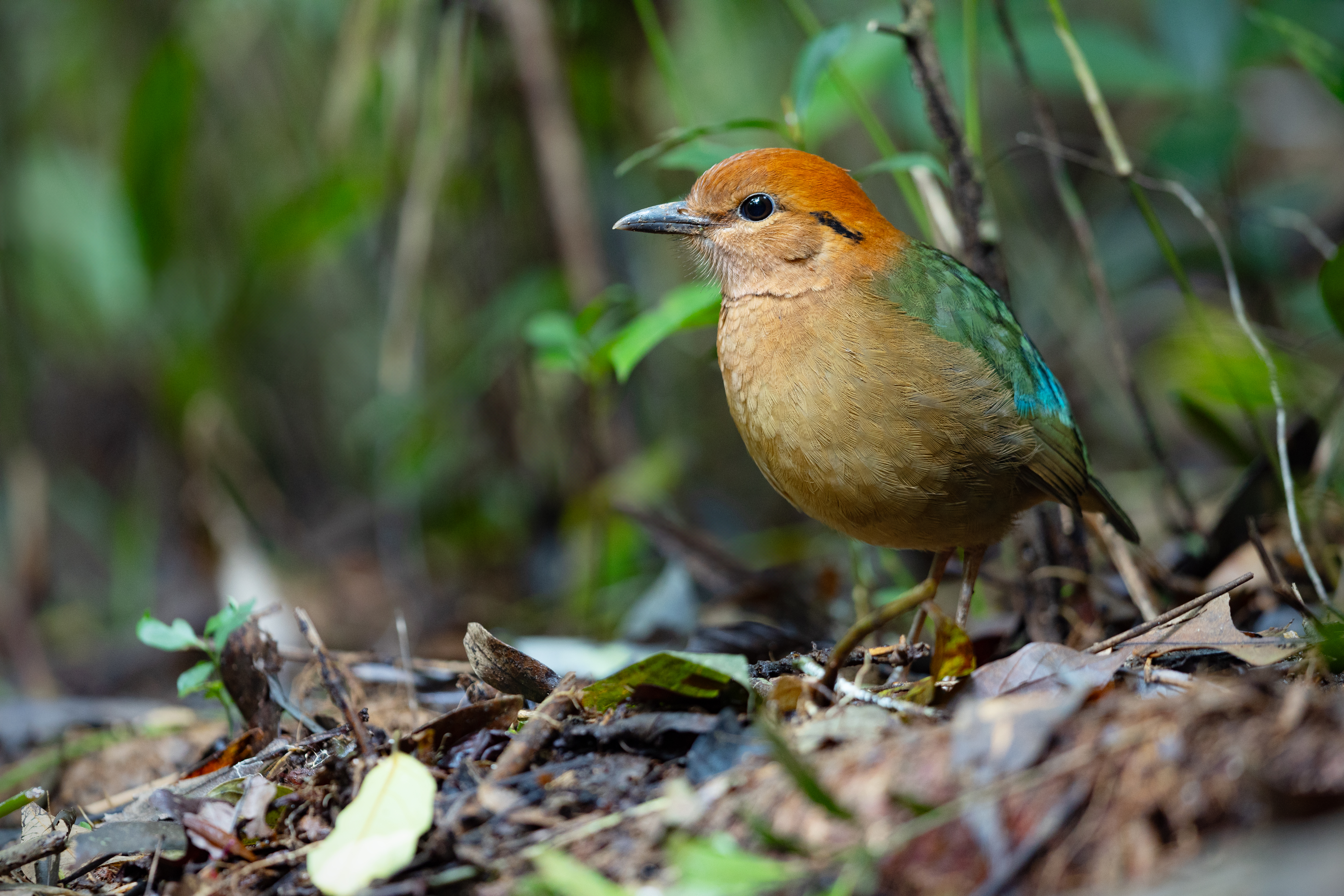
H. o. bolovenensis

The rusty-naped pitta was described by Allan Octavian Hume in 1873 from specimens collected in the eastern Pegu Range, Myanmar. Hume coined the current binomial name Hydrornis oatesi. The species was subsequently placed in the genus Pitta but was then moved back to the resurrected genus Hydrornis in 2006 based on the results of a molecular phylogenetic study. The genus Hydrornis had been introduced by the English zoologist Edward Blyth in 1843. The specific epithet was chosen to honour the amateur ornithologist Eugene William Oates who had collected the specimens.

Four subspecies are recognised:

- H. o. oatesi Hume, 1873 – from east Myanmar to northeast Laos and Thailand
- H. o. castaneiceps (Delacour & Jabouille, 1930) – southeast China to central Laos and northwest Vietnam
- H. o. bolovenensis (Delacour, 1932) – south Laos and south Vietnam
- H. o. deborah (King, BF, 1978) – central Malay Peninsula

== Description ==
The male has a deep brown head and underparts with dull green wings. It has a well defined black stripe behind the eyes. The female is duller than the male, with brownish tingeing on the wings and vague dark scaling on the lower throat.

== Distribution and habitat ==
The rusty-naped pitta is native to Indochina and adjacent parts of southern China. It inhabits subtropical or tropical moist lowland forests and subtropical, tropical moist montane forests and bamboo forests above the elevation of 800 m (2,600 ft).
