= Bumhpa Bum Wildlife Sanctuary =

Protected area in Myanmar

- Burmese: ဘွမ်ဖာဘွမ် တောရိုင်းတိရစ္ဆာန်ဘေးမဲ့တော
- IUCN category IV (habitat/species management area)
- Location within Myanmar
- Location: Sumprabum Township, Kachin State, Myanmar
- Nearest city: Sumprabom
- Coordinates: 26°31′0″N 97°23′0″E
- Area: 1,854.43 km^{2} (716.00 sq mi)
- Established: 2004
- Governing body: Myanmar Forest Department

Bumhpa Bum Wildlife Sanctuary is a protected area in Myanmar, covering an area of 1,854.43 km^{2} (716.00 sq mi). It was established in 2004. It ranges in elevation from 140 to 3,435 m (459 to 11,270 ft) and harbours evergreen forest in Kachin State.

Bumhpa Bum Wildlife Sanctuary is contiguous with Khakaborazi National Park and Hukaung Valley Wildlife Sanctuary. Together with Hponkanrazi Wildlife Sanctuary, they form a large continuous expanse of natural forest stretching over an area of 30,105 km^{2} (11,624 sq mi), called the Northern Forest Complex. It was established in 1996 with the objective to conserve the biodiversity of the Ayeyarwady and Chindwin river basins. It is managed by the Forest Department.

== Biodiversity ==
Bumhpa Bum Wildlife Sanctuary harbours tropical evergreen forest along with pine hill forest.

Wildlife recorded during a camera trap survey in 2001 included binturong (Arctictis binturong), yellow-throated marten (Martes flavigula), spotted linsang (Prionodon pardicolor), Asian palm civet (Paradoxurus hermaphroditus), masked palm civet (Paguma larvata), crab-eating mongoose (Herpestes urva), clouded leopard (Neofelis nebulosa), Asiatic golden cat (Catopuma temminckii), leopard cat (Prionailurus bengalensis) and marbled cat (Pardofelis marmorata). Asian elephant (Elephas maximus), gaur (Bos gaurus), mainland serow (Capricornis milneedwardsii), red goral (Naemorhedus baileyi) and golden jackal (Canis aureus) inhabit the sanctuary as well.
