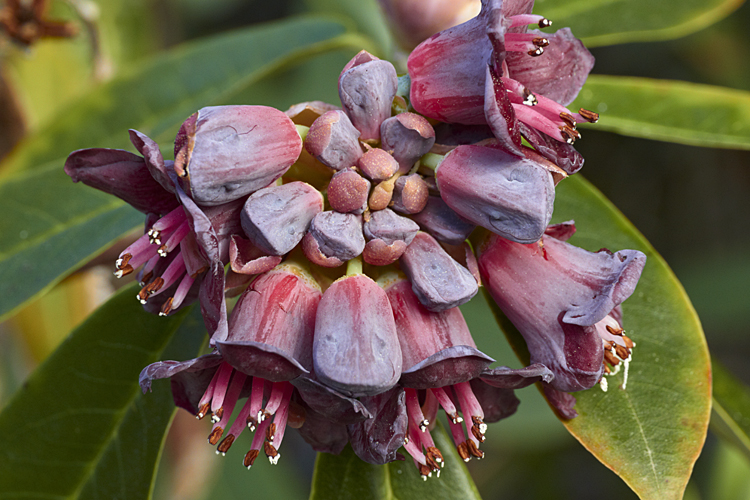

Scientific classification
- Kingdom: Plantae
- Clade: Tracheophytes
- Clade: Angiosperms
- Clade: Eudicots
- Clade: Asterids
- Order: Ericales
- Family: Ericaceae
- Genus: Rhododendron
- Species: R. pruniflorum

Binomial name
- Rhododendron pruniflorum Hutch. & Kingdon-Ward

Synonyms
- Rhododendron tsangpoense var. pruniflorum (Hutch. & Kingdon-Ward) Cowan & Davidian; Rhododendron sordidum Hutch.

= Rhododendron pruniflorum =

Species of plant

Rhododendron pruniflorum, the plum-flowered rhododendron, is a species of flowering plant in the family Ericaceae. It is an open, often rather leggy shrub found in northern Myanmar and nearby parts of India at elevations up to 4,000 m (13,000 ft). Growing to 1–1.5 m (3.3–4.9 ft), it occurs in coniferous woodlands that are dominated by species of fir (Abies).

The aromatic leaves are often glaucous, and the undersides have a coating of fine, pale grey scales. As the name pruniflorum (plum-flowered) suggests, the small, waxy flowers are an unusual plum-purple-red shade, though they may also be mauve to pink. The heads of 3–10 small flowers open late, not until early summer at higher elevations.
