= Hukawng Valley =

Valley in Myanmar

Coordinates: 26°26′18″N 96°33′32″E

Location of the Hukawng Valley in Burma

The Hukawng Valley (Burmese: ဟူးကောင်းချိုင့်ဝှမ်း; also spelt Hukaung Valley) is an isolated valley in Myanmar, roughly 5,586 square miles (14,468 km^{2}) in area. It is located in Tanaing Township in the Myitkyina District of Kachin State in the northernmost part of the country. It has the Hukaung Valley Wildlife Sanctuary.

== Rivers ==
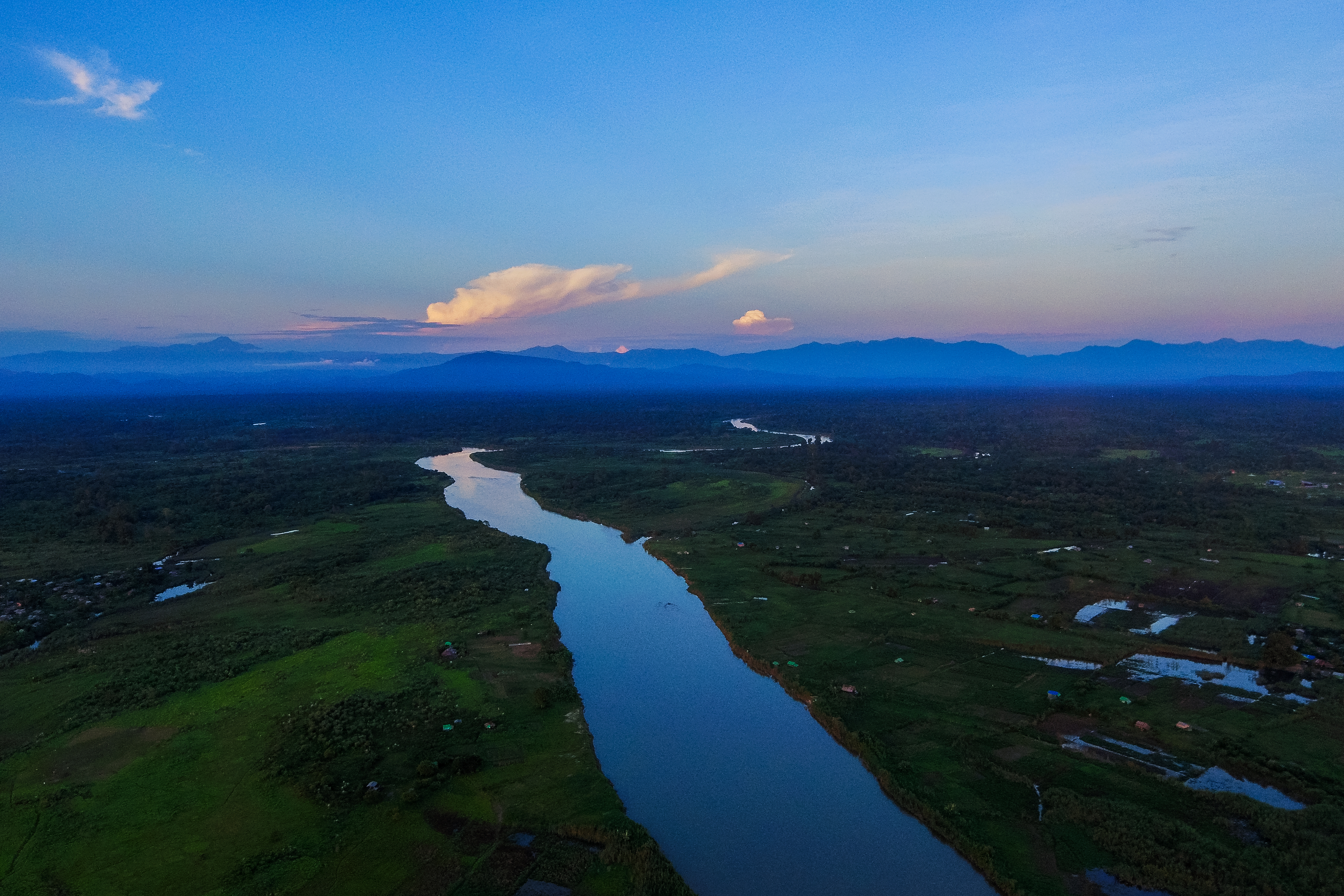
Aerial photo of Hukawng Valley

The rivers draining into the Hukawng Valley, the Tanai Kha, the Tabye, the Tawan, and the Turong, form the headwaters of the Chindwin River.

== Protected area ==
Ringed by steep mountain ranges to the north, east and west, the valley is known as a habitat of tigers, but encroachment by man has greatly decreased their numbers, to perhaps as few as 100 animals. In 2004, the government established the world's largest tiger preserve in the Hukawng Valley, the Hukaung Valley Wildlife Sanctuary, with an area of approximately 6,500 km^{2} (2,500 sq mi); later, the Sanctuary was extended to 21,800 km^{2}, making it the largest protected area in mainland Southeast Asia. The government's establishment of the preserve was accomplished in cooperation with the Kachin Independent Army, a formerly-rebel group that inhabits the region.

The extremely rare leaf muntjac, also known as the phet-gyi, dwarf deer or leaf deer, also lives in the Hukawng.

== Industries ==
Major industry includes amber and gold mining; most gold mines are now depleted, but the toxic chemicals from former gold extraction have not been cleared, and are seeping into the groundwater.

== Discoveries ==
The valley is well known for Burmese amber, a type of amber dating back to the Cretaceous period, around 99 million years ago.

== History ==
During World War II, the Ledo Road was built by the US Army across the Hukawng Valley, largely by African-American engineer battalions and Chinese laborers, in order to supply the armies of the Republic of China, who were then allied with the Western Allies in the war against the Empire of Japan.

== See also ==
- Ledo Road (Stillwell Road)
- Lake of No Return
- Pangsau Pass
