= Leaf muntjac =

Conservation status
- Data Deficient (IUCN 3.1)

Scientific classification
- Kingdom: Animalia
- Phylum: Chordata
- Class: Mammalia
- Infraclass: Placentalia
- Order: Artiodactyla
- Family: Cervidae
- Genus: Muntiacus
- Species: M. putaoensis

Binomial name
- Muntiacus putaoensis Amato, Egan & Rabinowitz, 1999
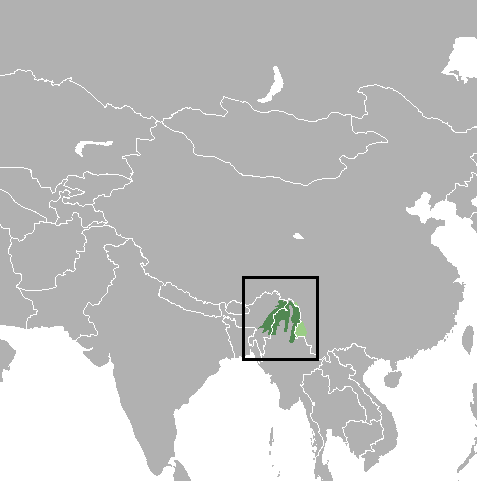

Species of deer

The leaf muntjac, leaf deer, or Putao muntjac (Muntiacus putaoensis) is a small species of muntjac. It was documented in 1997 by biologist Alan Rabinowitz during his field study in the isolated Nogmung Township in Myanmar. Rabinowitz discovered the species by examining the small carcass of a deer that he initially believed was the juvenile of another species; however, it proved to be the carcass of an adult female. He managed to obtain specimens, from which DNA analysis revealed a new cervid species. Local hunters knew of the species and called it the leaf deer because its body could be completely wrapped by a single large leaf. It is found in Myanmar and India.

== Distribution and habitat ==
The leaf muntjac is uniquely found in dense forests of Myanmar, in the Hukawng Valley region to the Northeast of Putao, hence its scientific epithet, and to the south of the Nam Tamai branch of the Mai Hka River. It is found at an altitude of 450 to 600 m; the transition zone between tropical forests and temperate ones. Its existence in India was first reported from the Lohit district in eastern Arunachal Pradesh. In 2002, it was also reported to exist in Namdapha Tiger Reserve and eastern Arunachal Pradesh, India. It has also been noted from the Lohit and Changlang region and near Noklak in Nagaland. It probably inhabits suitable habitat over the entire junction of the Pātkai Bum and the Kumon Taungdan ranges. In 2008 and 2009, its presence was reported in several new areas of Arunachal Pradesh.

== Description ==
An adult leaf deer stands at just 20 inches (50 cm) high at the shoulder and weighs less than 25 pounds (11 kg). They are light brown. Males have unbranched antlers that are about 1 inch (2.5 cm) in height. Other than this, the male and female deer are identical. This species is unusual among other deer because their offspring do not bear any spots. It also differs from other muntjacs because both the male and female have pronounced canine tusks. The leaf deer species characteristics of being small, preferring to roam alone, and living in habitats of dense forests in the mountains resembles the characteristics of ancient species of deer.

== Patterns of activity ==
Information on leaf muntjac behavior is limited, but similar muntjacs are often crepuscular, with others being both nocturnal and diurnal. In addition, leaf muntjacs are usually solitary, except for during the female muntjac's pregnancy, in which case the male mating partner will also be present. Fruit and leaf traces upon autopsy indicates their diets contribute to local seed dispersal practices.

== Conservation and status ==
On the IUCN Red List this species is classified as Data Deficient, as there is lack of certainty about its morphology, distribution, taxonomy and ecology. There has been evidence of persistent hunting by local people and this suggests that numbers are decreasing.
