= Hukaung Valley Wildlife Sanctuary =

Wildlife sanctuary in northern Myanmar

- Burmese: ဟူကောင်း ကျား ထိန်းသိမ်းရေး နယ်မြေ
- IUCN category IV (habitat/species management area)
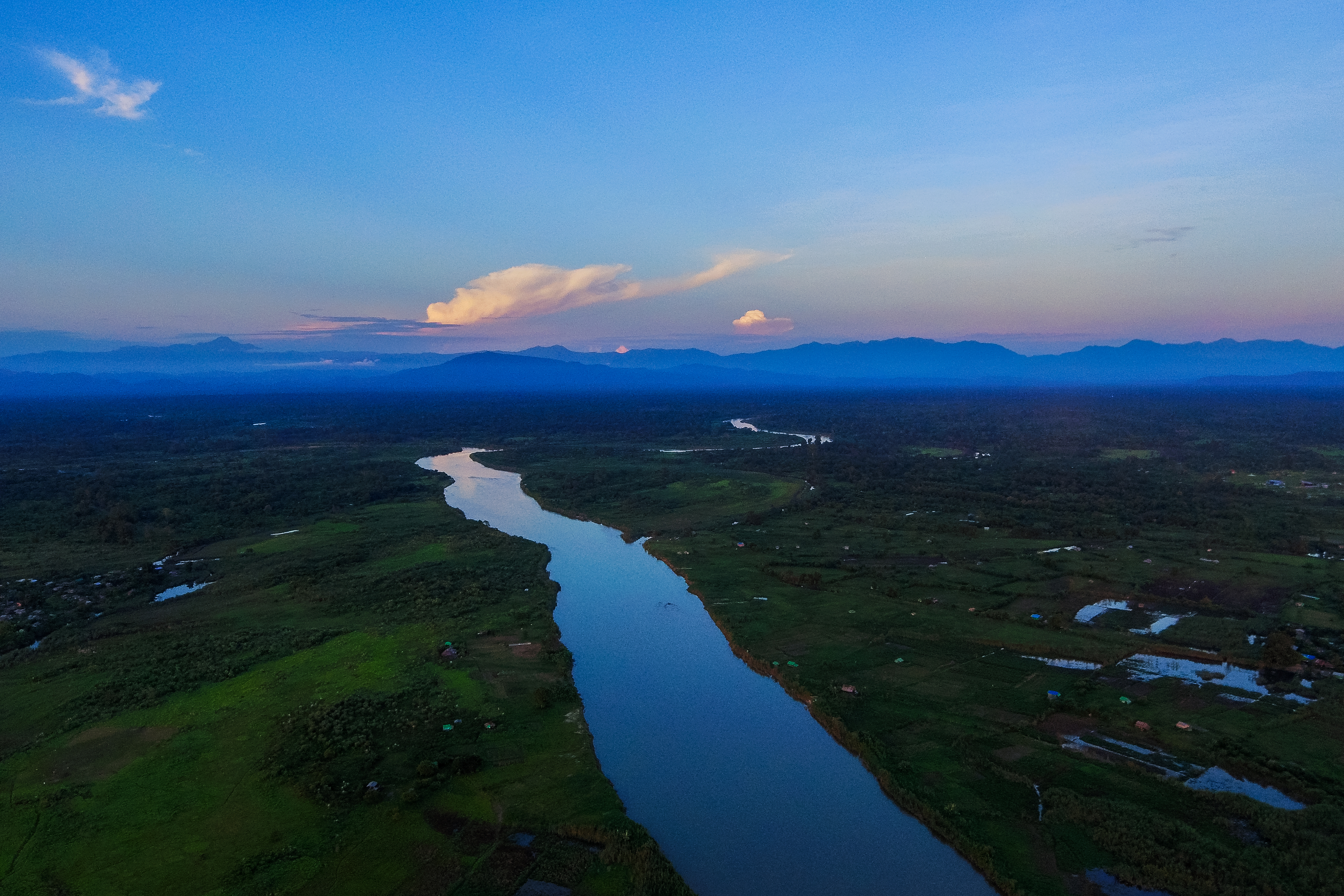
- Hukaung Valley
- Interactive map of Hukaung Valley Wildlife Sanctuary
- Location: Tanaing Township, Kachin State, Myanmar
- Nearest city: Tanai
- Coordinates: 26°26′18″N 96°33′32″E
- Area: 17,373.57 km^{2} (6,707.97 sq mi)
- Established: 2004
- Governing body: Myanmar Forest Department

Hukaung Valley Wildlife Sanctuary is a protected area in northern Myanmar, covering 17,373.57 km^{2} (6,707.97 sq mi). It was established in 2004 and extended to its present size in 2010. It was initially gazetted in 2004 with an area of 6,371 km^{2} (2,460 sq mi) in Tanaing Township and extended to Kamaing, Nayun and Kamti Townships. In elevation, it ranges from 125 to 3,435 m (410 to 11,270 ft) in the Hukawng Valley located in Kachin State and Sagaing Region. It harbours evergreen and mixed deciduous forests.

Wildlife recorded during camera trapping surveys between 2001 and 2011 comprised tiger (Panthera tigris), leopard (P. pardus), clouded leopard (Neofelis nebulosa), Asian golden cat (Catopuma temminckii), marbled cat (Pardofelis marmorata), leopard cat (Prionailurus bengalensis). yellow-throated marten (Martes flavigula), binturong (Arctictis binturong), large Indian civet (Viverra zibetha), large-spotted civet (V. megaspila), small Indian civet (Viverricula indica), masked palm civet (Paguma larvata), Asian palm civet (Paradoxurus hermaphroditus), hog badger (Arctonyx collaris) and spotted linsang (Prionodon pardicolor).

More than 200,000 acres of land in Hukawng Valley are being used for gold mining, causing environmental damage. The Wildlife Conservation Society (WCS) was criticized for its role in the protected area, particularly for blaming indigenous peoples for environmental damage, though this was found to be untrue since WCS was found to support small infrastructure projects and donate rice and supplies to villagers.

== See also ==
- Ledo Road (Stillwell Road)
- Lake of No Return
- Pangsau Pass
