= List of protected areas of Myanmar =

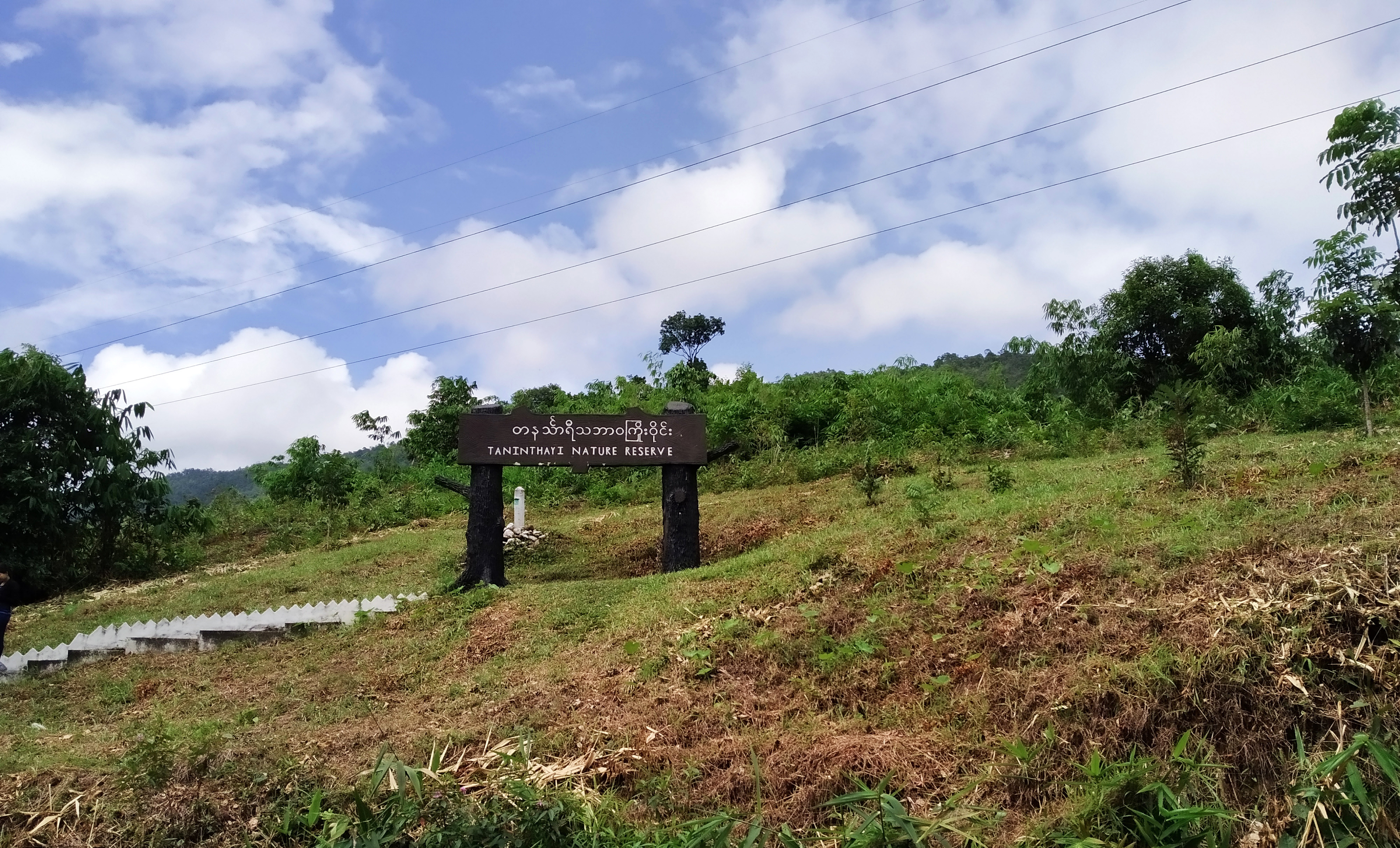
Entrance to Tanintharyi Nature Reserve.

This list of protected areas of Myanmar includes national parks, wildlife sanctuaries and botanical gardens that were established since 1927.

== National parks ==
- Alaungdaw Kathapa National Park in Sagaing Region, 1,402.8 km^{2} (541.6 sq mi)
- Bwe Par Taung National Park in Chin State, 176.16 km^{2} (68.02 sq mi)
- Emawbum National Park in Kachin State, 603.4 km^{2} (233.0 sq mi)
- Hkakaborazi National Park in Kachin State, 3,812.46 km^{2} (1,472.00 sq mi)
- Inkhain Bum National Park in Kachin State, 300.52 km^{2} (116.03 sq mi)
- Lampi Island Marine National Park in Tanintharyi Region, 204.48 km^{2} (78.95 sq mi)
- Natmataung National Park in Chin State, 713.06 km^{2} (275.31 sq mi)
- Popa Mountain National Park in Mandalay Region, 128.54 km^{2} (49.63 sq mi)

== Wildlife sanctuaries ==
- Bumhpa Bum Wildlife Sanctuary in Kachin State, 1,854.43 km^{2} (716.00 sq mi)
- Chatthin Wildlife Sanctuary in Sagaing Region, 260.07 km^{2} (100.41 sq mi)
- Htamanthi Wildlife Sanctuary in Sagaing Region, 2,150.73 km^{2} (830.40 sq mi)
- Hukaung Valley Wildlife Sanctuary in Kachin State, 6,371.37 km^{2} (2,460.00 sq mi) plus extension of 11,002.2 km^{2} (4,248.0 sq mi)
- Indawgyi Lake Wildlife Sanctuary in Kachin State, 814.99 km^{2} (314.67 sq mi)
- Inlay Lake Wetland Sanctuary in Shan State, 533.73 km^{2} (206.07 sq mi)
- Kahilu Wildlife Sanctuary
- Kyauk Pan Taung Wildlife Sanctuary in Chin State, 130.6 km^{2} (50.4 sq mi)
- Kelatha Wildlife Sanctuary in Mon State
- Kyaikhtiyo Wildlife Sanctuary in Mon State, 156.21 km^{2} (60.31 sq mi)
- Loimwe Protected Area in Shan State, 41.35 km^{2} (15.97 sq mi).
- Mahamyaing Wildlife Sanctuary in Sagaing Region, 136.69 km^{2} (52.78 sq mi)
- Mein-ma-hla Kyun Wildlife Sanctuary in Ayeyarwady Region, 500 km^{2} (190 sq mi)
- Minwuntaung Wildlife Sanctuary in Sagaing Region, 205.88 km^{2} (79.49 sq mi)
- Minsontaung Wildlife Sanctuary in Mandalay Region, 22.56 km^{2} (8.71 sq mi)
- Moeyungyi Wetland Wildlife Sanctuary in Bago Region, 103.6 km^{2} (40.0 sq mi)
- Moscos Islands Wildlife Sanctuary in Tanintharyi Region, 49.21 km^{2} (19.00 sq mi)
- Mulayit Wildlife Sanctuary in Kayin State, 138.56 km^{2} (53.50 sq mi)
- Panlaung and Padalin Cave Wildlife Sanctuary in Shan State, 333.8 km^{2} (128.9 sq mi)
- Parsar Protected Area in Shan State, 76.53 km^{2} (29.55 sq mi)
- Pidaung Wildlife Sanctuary in Kachin State, 122.07 km^{2} (47.13 sq mi)
- Pyin-O-Lwin Bird Sanctuary in Mandalay Region, 127.25 km^{2} (49.13 sq mi)
- Rakhine Yoma Elephant Reserve in Rakhine State, 1,755.7 km^{2} (677.9 sq mi)
- Shwesettaw Wildlife Reserve in Magwe Region, 464.09 km^{2} (179.19 sq mi)
- Shwe-U-Daung Wildlife Sanctuary
- Thamihla Kyun Wildlife Sanctuary in Ayeyarwady Region, 0.88 km^{2} (0.34 sq mi)
- Tanintharyi Nature Reserve in the Tenasserim Hills, 1,699.99 km^{2} (656.37 sq mi)
- Taunggyi Bird Sanctuary in the Shan Hills, 7.27 km^{2} (2.81 sq mi)
- Wethtigan Wildlife Sanctuary in Magwe Region, 3.72 km^{2} (1.44 sq mi)

== Nature parks ==
- Hlawga Park in northern Yangon Region, 6.23 km^{2} (2.41 sq mi)
- Myaing Hay Wun Elephant Park in Yangon Region
- National Kandawgyi Botanical Gardens in Mandalay Region
- Sein Ye Forest Park in Bago Region

== See also ==
- Deforestation in Myanmar
