= List of ecoregions in Myanmar =

The following is a list of ecoregions in Myanmar (also known as Burma).

== Terrestrial ecoregions ==
Myanmar is in the Indomalayan realm. ecoregions are listed by biome.

=== Tropical and subtropical moist broadleaf forests ===
- Andaman Islands rain forests (India, Myanmar)
- Chin Hills–Arakan Yoma montane forests (Myanmar, India)
- Irrawaddy freshwater swamp forests (Myanmar)
- Irrawaddy moist deciduous forests (Myanmar)
- Kayah–Karen montane rain forests (Myanmar, Thailand)
- Lower Gangetic Plains moist deciduous forests (Bangladesh, India, Myanmar)
- Mizoram–Manipur–Kachin rain forests (Myanmar, Bangladesh, India, China)
- Myanmar coastal rain forests (Myanmar)
- Northern Indochina subtropical forests (Myanmar, China, Laos, Thailand, Vietnam)
- Northern Triangle subtropical forests (Myanmar)
- Tenasserim–South Thailand semi-evergreen rain forests (Myanmar, Malaysia, Thailand)

=== Tropical and subtropical dry broadleaf forests ===
- Central Indochina dry forests (Cambodia, Laos, Thailand, Vietnam, Myanmar)
- Irrawaddy dry forests (Myanmar)

=== Tropical and subtropical coniferous forests ===
- Northeast India–Myanmar pine forests (Myanmar, India)

=== Temperate broadleaf and mixed forests ===
- Eastern Himalayan broadleaf forests (Bhutan, India, Nepal, Myanmar, China)
- Northern Triangle temperate forests (Myanmar)

=== Temperate coniferous forests ===
- Eastern Himalayan subalpine conifer forests (Bhutan, India, Nepal, Myanmar, China)
- Nujiang Lancang Gorge alpine conifer and mixed forests (Myanmar, China)

=== Mangroves ===
- Myanmar Coast mangroves (Myanmar, Thailand, Bangladesh, Malaysia)

=== Montane grasslands and shrublands ===
- Eastern Himalayan alpine shrub and meadows (Myanmar, Bhutan, China, India, Nepal)

== Freshwater ecoregions ==
- Chin Hills-Arakan Coast (Bangladesh, India, Myanmar)
- Sitang-Irrawaddy (China, India, Myanmar)
- Mekong (Cambodia, China, Laos, Myanmar, Thailand, Vietnam)
  - Lower Lancang (Mekong) (China, Laos, Myanmar, Thailand)
- Salween (China, Myanmar, Thailand)
  - Lower and Middle Salween (China, Myanmar, Thailand)
  - Inle Lake (Myanmar)
  - Upper Salween (China, Myanmar)

== Marine ecoregions ==
Myanmar's seas are in the Western Indo-Pacific marine realm. Myanmar's two marine ecoregions are:

- Andaman Sea Coral Coast
- Northern Bay of Bengal
