= Karen Hills =

Hill region in eastern Burma

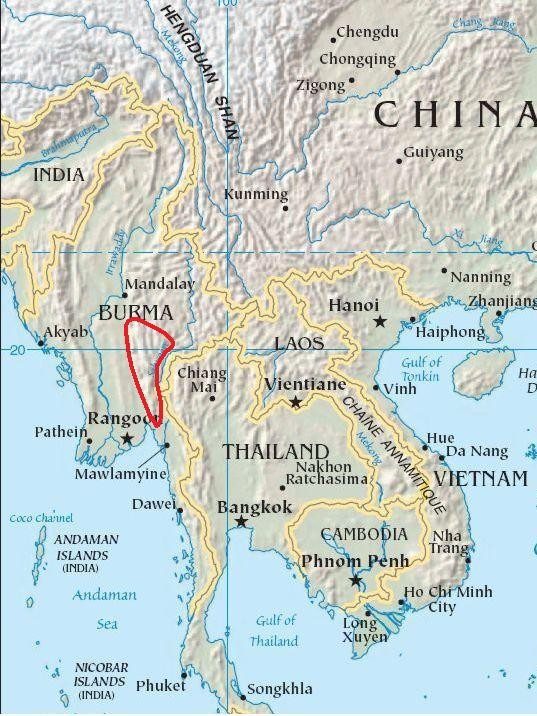
- Location of the Karen Hills

Highest point
- Peak: Nattaung
- Elevation: 2,623 m (8,606 ft)
- Coordinates: 18°49′N 97°2′E

Geography
- Country: Burma
- Range coordinates: 19°12′N 97°17′E
- Parent range: Shan Hills

Geology
- Rock type(s): Granite, limestone

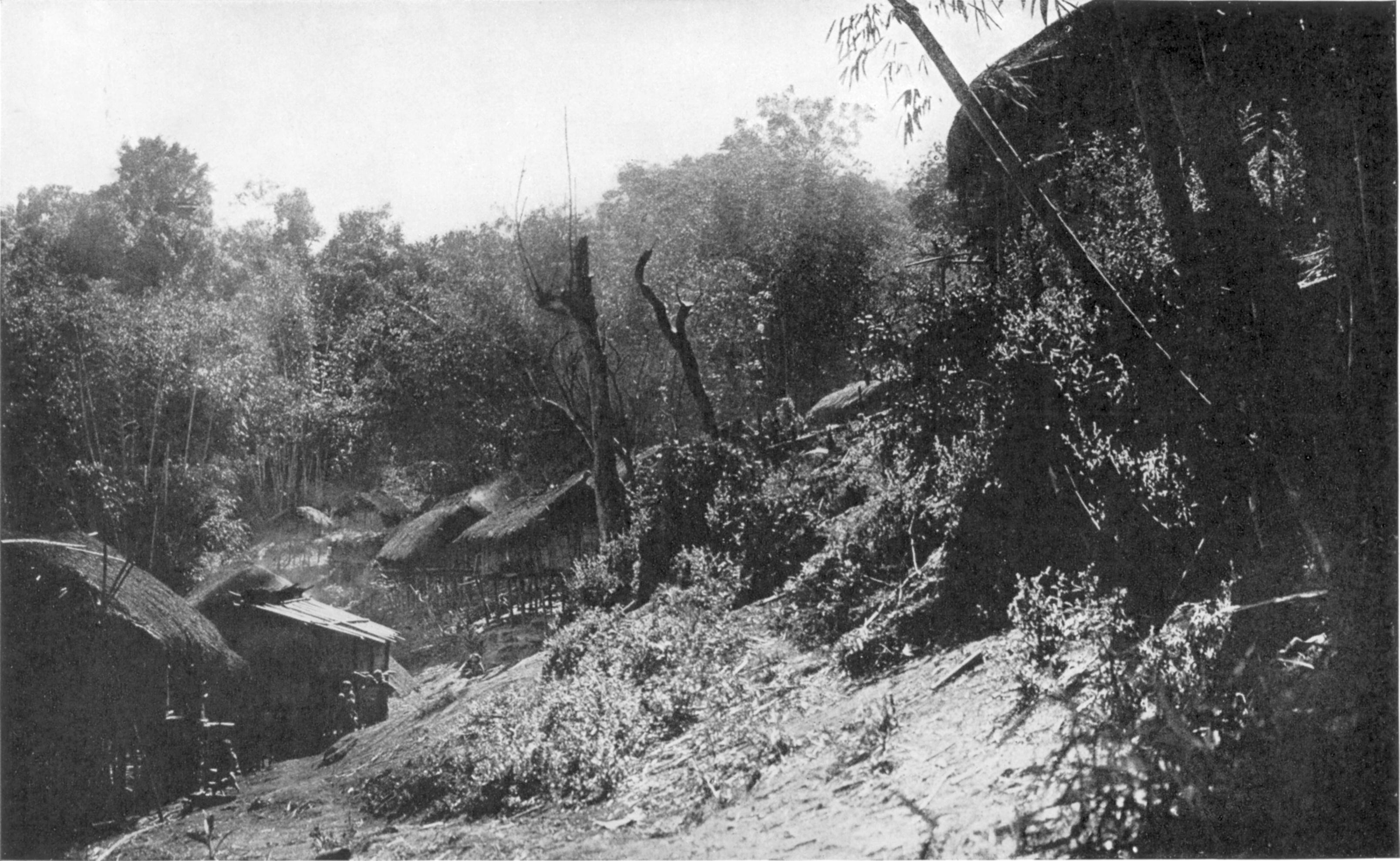
A temporarily abandoned village in the Karen Hills in 1922

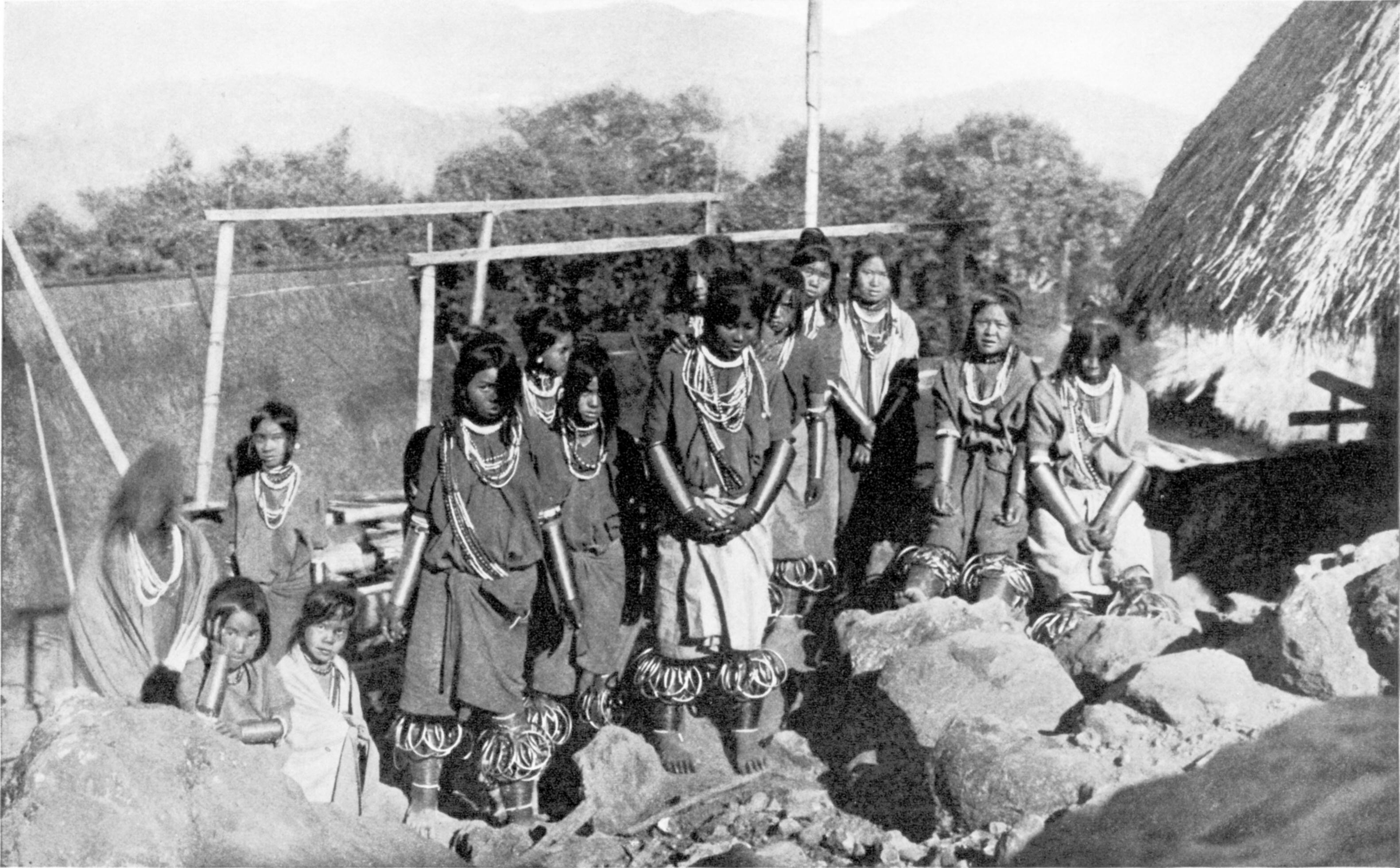
Women of the Karen Hills in 1922

The Karen Hills, (Pwo Eastern Karen: ဖၠုံခေါဟ်လံင်, S'gaw Karen: တီအူကစၢၢ်ခိၣ်, Burmese: ကရင်တောင်တန်း) also known as Kayah-Karen Mountains, are one of the main hill ranges in eastern Myanmar. They are located at the SW corner of Shan State and in Kayah State, a mountainous region where the only relatively flat area is Loikaw, the capital. The southern end runs into Kayin State. One of the first all-weather roads in Burma was across the Karen Hills connecting Taungoo with Loilem.

Lawpita Falls, Myanmar's largest hydropower plant, built by the Japanese as war reparation, is located in these mountains.

The name of the range is derived from the Karen people who occupy the highland area. In colonial times these mountains were often referred to as the "Toungoo Hills", for they rise east of Taungoo (formerly "Toungoo").

== Geography ==
Geographically the Karen Hills are the southwestern projection of the Shan Hills. The highest peak is Nattaung, one of the ultra-prominent peaks in Southeast Asia. Another prominent mountain is 1,249 m high Takolaw Kyo.

The Karen Hills rise from Burma's central plain and stretch for 120 km eastwards in their broadest part until they reach the Salween (Thanlwin) River valley. The steep gorge of this river, one of the main rivers in Burma, divides the Karen Hills from the Dawna Range in the east.

== Human activity and ecology ==
The Karen Hills are covered with dense montane rainforest. Local villages used to be far up in the hills and as much off the main roads as possible and villagers used to cultivate upland rice in forest clearings. Owing to the activity of the Tatmadaw in the area many local people have moved across the border into Thailand where they live in refugee camps.

These mountains are geologically and ecologically homogeneous with the neighboring Dawna Range and the head of the Tenasserim Hills, so that frequently the whole[mountainous area is considered as a whole under the name "Kayah–Karen/Tenasserim". They are covered with tropical and subtropical moist broadleaf forests, the Kayah–Karen montane rain forests; these are part of the Kayah–Karen/Tenasserim moist forests ecoregion which is included in the Global 200 list of ecoregions identified by the World Wide Fund for Nature as priorities for conservation. Among the rare and vulnerable species in these highlands, Kitti's hog-nosed bat and the holoparasitic flowering plant Sapria himalayana deserve mention.

=== Protected areas ===
There were two main protected areas during British rule, the Kahilu Reserved Forest and the Sinswe Reserved Forest. Since the area is a conflict zone, the KNU initially delimited an area in the Minanwe Wildlife Sanctuary, but in recent years these forests have seen unprecedented destruction.

== See also ==
- List of ecoregions in Myanmar
