= Irrawaddy dry forests =

Ecoregion in Myanmar

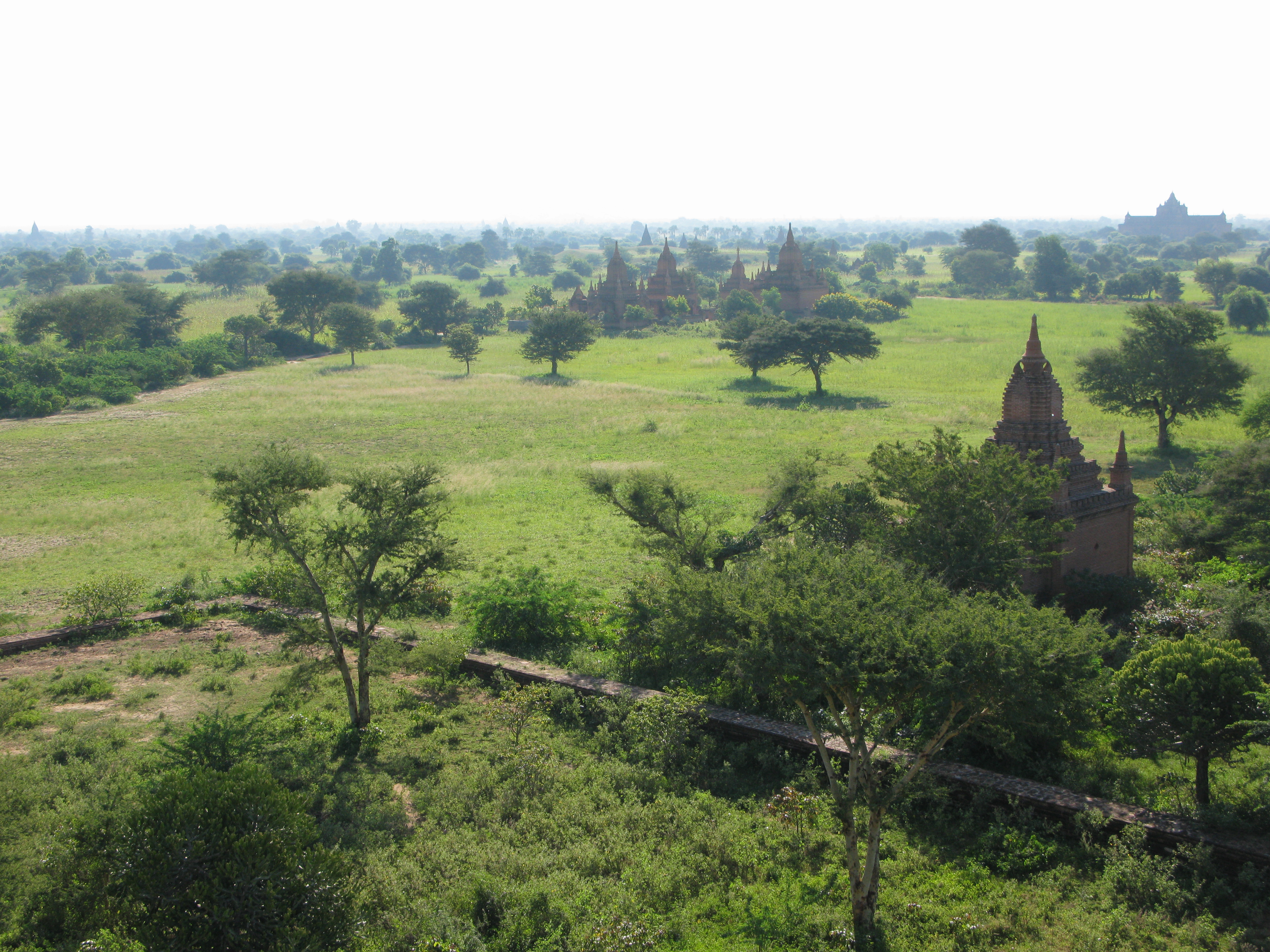
- Irrawaddy dry forests in Bagan

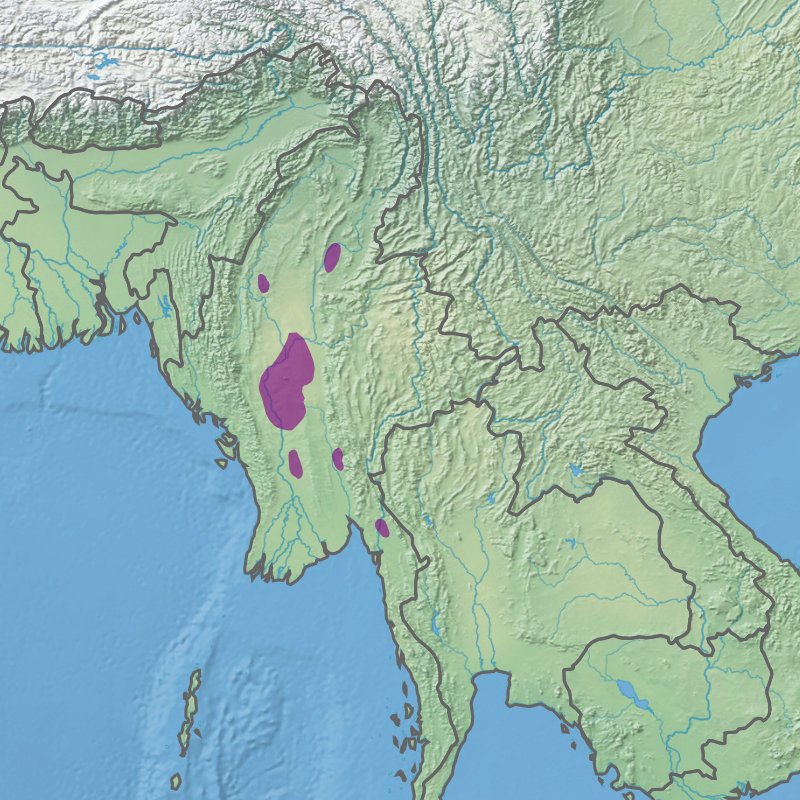
- Ecoregion territory (in purple)

Ecology
- Realm: Indomalayan realm
- Biome: tropical and subtropical dry broadleaf forests
- Borders: Irrawaddy moist deciduous forests; Kayah–Karen montane rain forests

Geography
- Area: 34,988 km^{2} (13,509 mi^{2})
- Country: Myanmar
- Administrative divisions: Bago Region; Kayin State; Magway Region; Mandalay Region; Sagaing Region, Shan State

Conservation
- Conservation status: Critical/endangered
- Protected: 167 km² (>1%)

The Irrawaddy dry forests is a tropical dry broadleaf forest ecoregion in central Myanmar. The ecoregion occupies portions of the Irrawaddy, Sittaung, and Salween river basins, in areas with less than 800 mm of annual rainfall.

== Geography ==
The Irrawaddy dry forests occupy an area of 34,988 km². The ecoregion consists of several enclaves in the basins of Irrawaddy, upper Sittaung, and lower Salween rivers. The dry forests are bounded by the Irrawaddy moist deciduous forests.

== Flora ==
Dry mixed deciduous forest, also called Than Dahat forest, is predominantly teak (Tectona hamiltoniana), with Terminalia oliveri, Senegalia catechu, and Bauhinia racemosa.

Dry deciduous dipterocarp forest, known as Indaing, is an open-canopied woodland with an understory of herbs and grasses. Dipterocarps are predominant, including Dipterocarpus tuberculatus, Shorea siamensis, Shorea obtusa, and Shorea oblongifolia. Trees in the pea family (Fabaceae) are also present, including species of Afzelia, Pterocarpus, Dalbergia, Xylia, and Sindora. High Indaing is woodland with trees up to 20 meters high. Low Indaing is made up of high shrubs and low trees, and is often the result of repeated cutting and burning of high Indaing.

== Fauna ==
The ecoregion is home several medium-sized and small mammals, including Indian muntjac (Muntiacus muntjak), Eld's deer (Cervus eldi), sambar deer (Cervus unicolor), Indian hog deer (Hyelaphus porcinus), Indian jackal (Canis aureus indicus), rhesus macaque (Macaca mulatta), western hoolock gibbon (Hoolock hoolock), and jungle cat (Felis chaus). Larger mammals, including Indian elephant and tiger, have been extirpated from the ecoregion.

The Popa langur (Trachypithecus popa) is endemic to the ecoregion. The critically endangered species is limited 200 to 250 individuals in four isolated populations, including Mount Popa.

== Protected areas ==
A 2017 assessment found that only 167 km², or less than 1%, of the ecoregion is in protected areas. Another 9% is forested but outside of protected areas. Protected areas in the ecoregion include Popa Mountain National Park and Lawkananda Wildlife Sanctuary.
