= Kyauk Pan Taung Wildlife Sanctuary =

Protected area in Myanmar

- Burmese: ကျောက်ပန်တောင် တောရိုင်းတိရစ္ဆာန် ဘေးမဲ့တော
- IUCN category IV (habitat/species management area)
- Location within Myanmar
- Location: Paletwa Township, Chin State, Myanmar
- Nearest city: Sami
- Coordinates: 21°21′N 93°00′E
- Area: 130.6 square kilometres (50.4 sq mi) or 133 square kilometres (51 sq mi)
- Established: 2013
- Governing body: Myanmar Forest Department

Kyauk Pan Taung Wildlife Sanctuary is a wildlife sanctuary (IUCN category IV) in Paletwa Township in southern Chin State in western Myanmar. It is administered by the Myanmar Forest Department.

== Description ==
Kyauk Pan Taung is an isolated massif with a base at 25 metres (82 ft) and a summit at 1,310 metres (4,300 ft). It covers an area of either 130.6 square kilometres (50.4 sq mi) or 133 square kilometres (51 sq mi) along the Mee River.

The mean annual rainfall in the area ranges from 3,000 to 3,300 millimetres (120 to 130 in), making it one of the rainiest regions of the country.

== Biodiversity ==
It was proposed as a protected area in 2001 and designated in 2013. It is both an Important Bird Area (2004) and a Key Biodiversity Area (2012).

It is home to the Rufous-necked hornbill, which was rated as vulnerable on the IUCN Red List as of 2020. Another resident, the Arakan forest turtle, is classified as critically endangered; it is eaten by indigenous people and threatened by habitat loss.

Key wildlife species include wild boar (Sus scrofa), leopard (Panthera pardus), jungle cat (Felis chaus), serow (Capricornis sumatraensis), red goral (Naemorhedus baileyi), clouded leopard (Neofelis nebulosa), sambar (Rusa unicolor), and barking deer (Muntiacus). A 2017 survey reported 138 bird species.

From 200 to 250 metres (660 to 820 ft), it features the bamboo Melocanna baccifera, which transitions into evergreen forest at 600 to 650 metres (1,970 to 2,130 ft). The summit has "open savannah-like vegetation with abundant graminoids and scattered, low-stature trees."
