= Irrawaddy moist deciduous forests =

Ecoregion in Myanmar

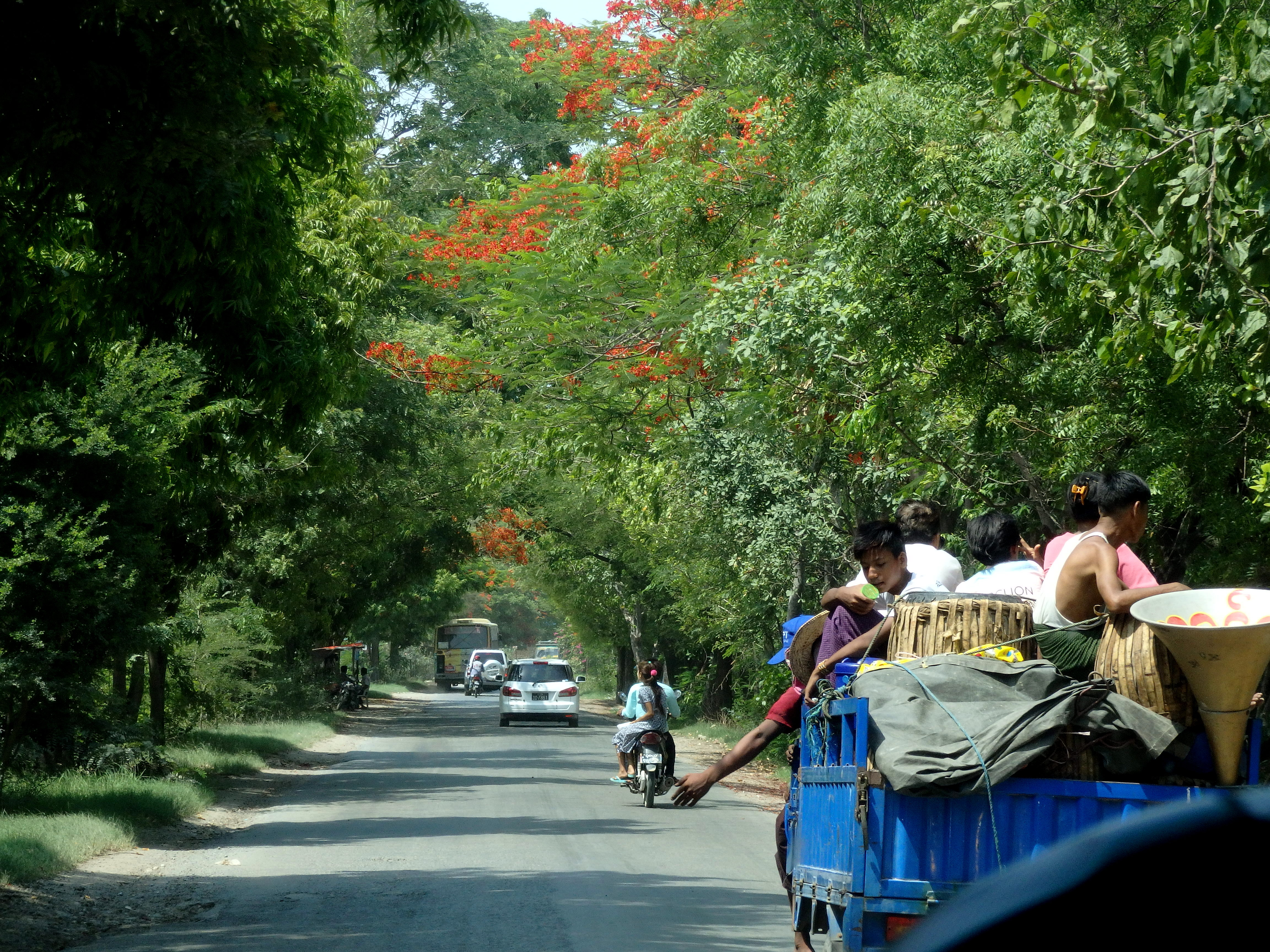
- Road in Amarapura, outside of Mandalay

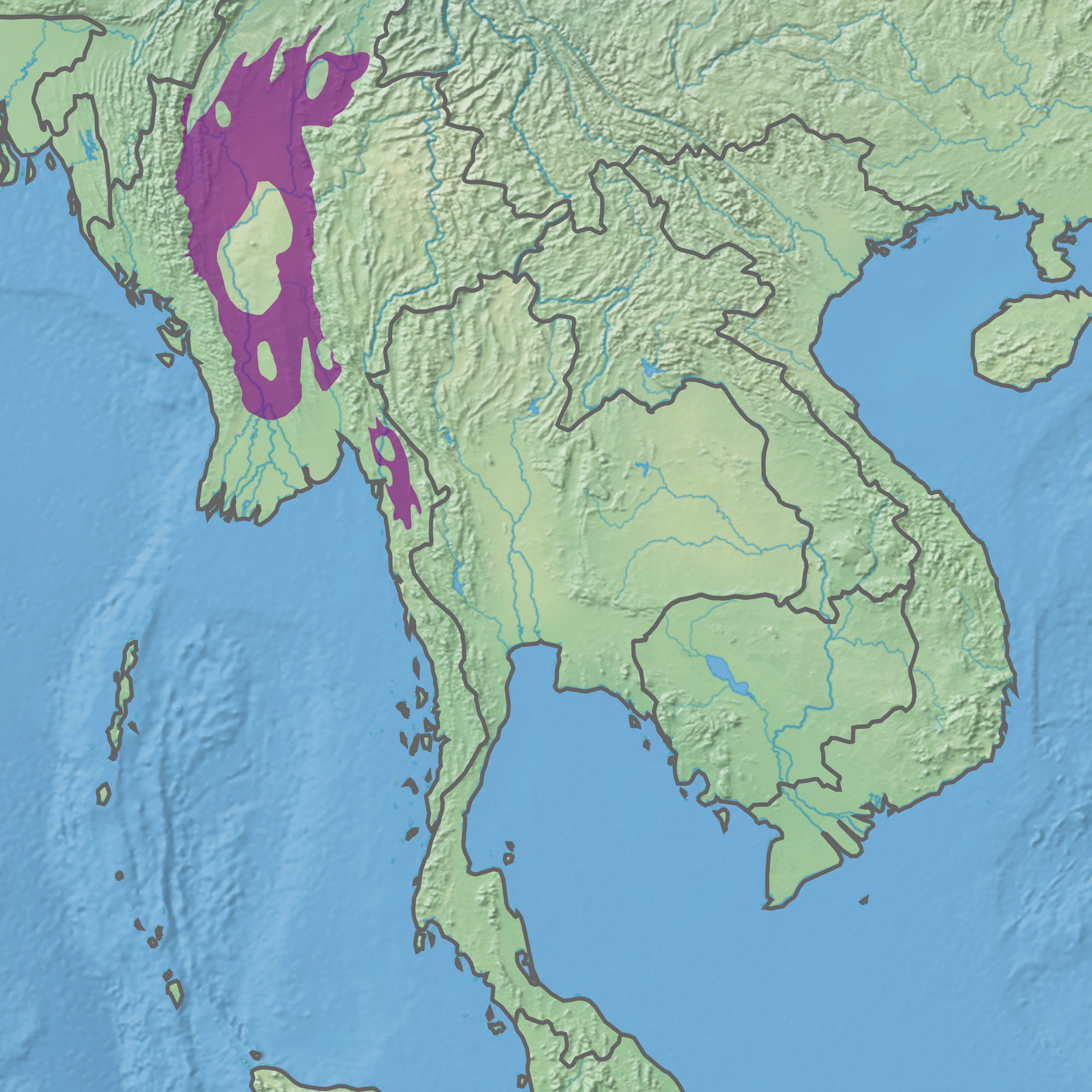
- Ecoregion territory (in purple)

Ecology
- Realm: Indomalayan realm
- Biome: tropical and subtropical moist broadleaf forests
- Borders: List: Chin Hills-Arakan Yoma montane forests; Irrawaddy dry forests; Kayah–Karen montane rain forests; Mizoram–Manipur–Kachin rain forests; Myanmar coastal rain forests; Northern Indochina subtropical forests; Tenasserim–South Thailand semi-evergreen rain forests

Geography
- Area: 137,909 km^{2} (53,247 mi^{2})
- Country: Myanmar
- Administrative divisions: Bago Region; Kayin State; Magway Region; Mandalay Region; Mon State; Naypyidaw Union Territory; Sagaing Region, Shan State

Conservation
- Conservation status: vulnerable
- Protected: 4,359 km² (3%)

The Irrawaddy moist deciduous forests is a tropical moist broadleaf forest ecoregion in central Myanmar. The ecoregion occupies the central basin of the Irrawaddy River and the lower basin of the Salween River. The ecoregion is characterized by forests of tall trees which drop their leaves in the dry season. Most of the ecoregion's forests have been converted to agriculture.

== Geography ==
The Irrawaddy moist deciduous forests occupy an area of 137,909 km². The ecoregion lies in central Myanmar, on low hills and undulating lowlands in the basins of the Irrawaddy and Salween rivers. The larger portion of the ecoregion is in the basin of the Irrawaddy and its tributaries, and the upper basin of the Sittaung River. It is bounded by the Mizoram–Manipur–Kachin rain forests on the southwest and north, and the Chin Hills–Arakan Yoma montane forests in Chin Hills and Arakan Mountains to the west. The Pegu Range lies to the east, home to subtropical and montane forests. The Myanmar coastal rain forests lie to the south.

A smaller area lies to the southeast in the lower basin of the Salween and Gyaing rivers. It is bounded on the west and northwest by the Myanmar coastal rain forests, and on the east by the Kayah–Karen montane rain forests.

The moist deciduous forests surround enclaves of Irrawaddy dry forests, which occur in areas with less than 800 mm of annual rainfall.

== Flora ==
The forests are characterized by dry-season deciduous trees which form a tall continuous canopy. Dominant tree species are teak (Tectona grandis) and Pyinkado (Xylia xylocarpa var. kerrii), with Terminalia tomentosa, Terminalia belerica, Terminalia pyrifolia, Homalium tomentosum, Bombax insigne, Gmelina arborea, Lannea grandis, Lannea coromandelica, Pterocarpus macrocarpus, Millettia pendula, Berrya ammonilla, Mitragyna rotundifolia, and species of Vitex. The evergreen canopy forests are interspersed with stands of bamboo, and occasional large evergreen trees.

== Fauna ==
The ecoregion is home to several large mammals, including Asian elephant (Elephas maximus), gaur (Bos gaurus), Himalayan black bear (Selenarctos thibetanus), sun bear (Helarctos malayanus), Sambar deer (Cervus unicolor) Mainland serow (Capricornis milneedwardsii), Indian hog deer (Hyelaphus porcinus), dhole (Cuon alpinus), Asian golden cat (Catopuma temminckii), marbled cat (Pardofelis marmorata), leopard cat (Prionailurus bengalensis), masked palm civet (Paguma larvata), binturong (Arctictis binturong), spotted linsang (Prionodon pardicolor), and capped langur (Trachypithecus pileatus).

== Protected areas ==
A 2017 assessment found that 4,359 km², or 3%, of the ecoregion is in protected areas. Another 4% is forested but outside protected areas.

Protected areas include Alaungdaw Kathapa National Park, Kyatthin Wildlife Sanctuary, Minwuntaung Wildlife Sanctuary, Moeyungyi Wetland Wildlife Sanctuary, and Shwesettaw Wildlife Sanctuary.
