= Myanmar coastal rain forests =

Ecoregion on Mainland Southeast Asia

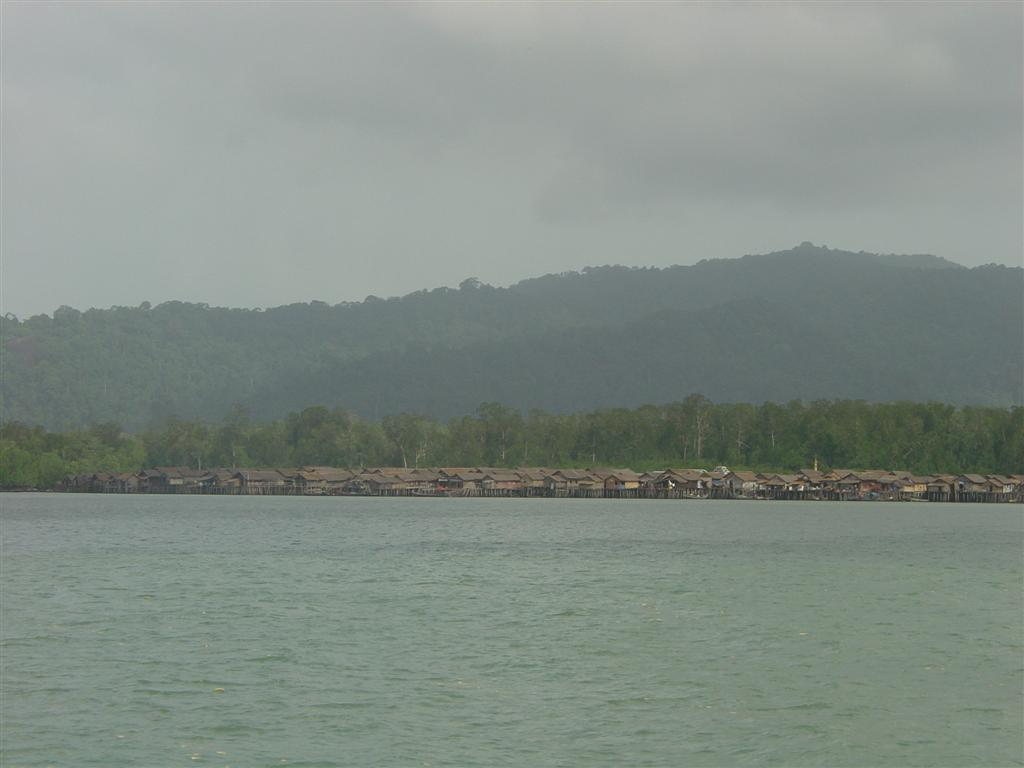
- Myeik Village on the southern coast of Myanmar

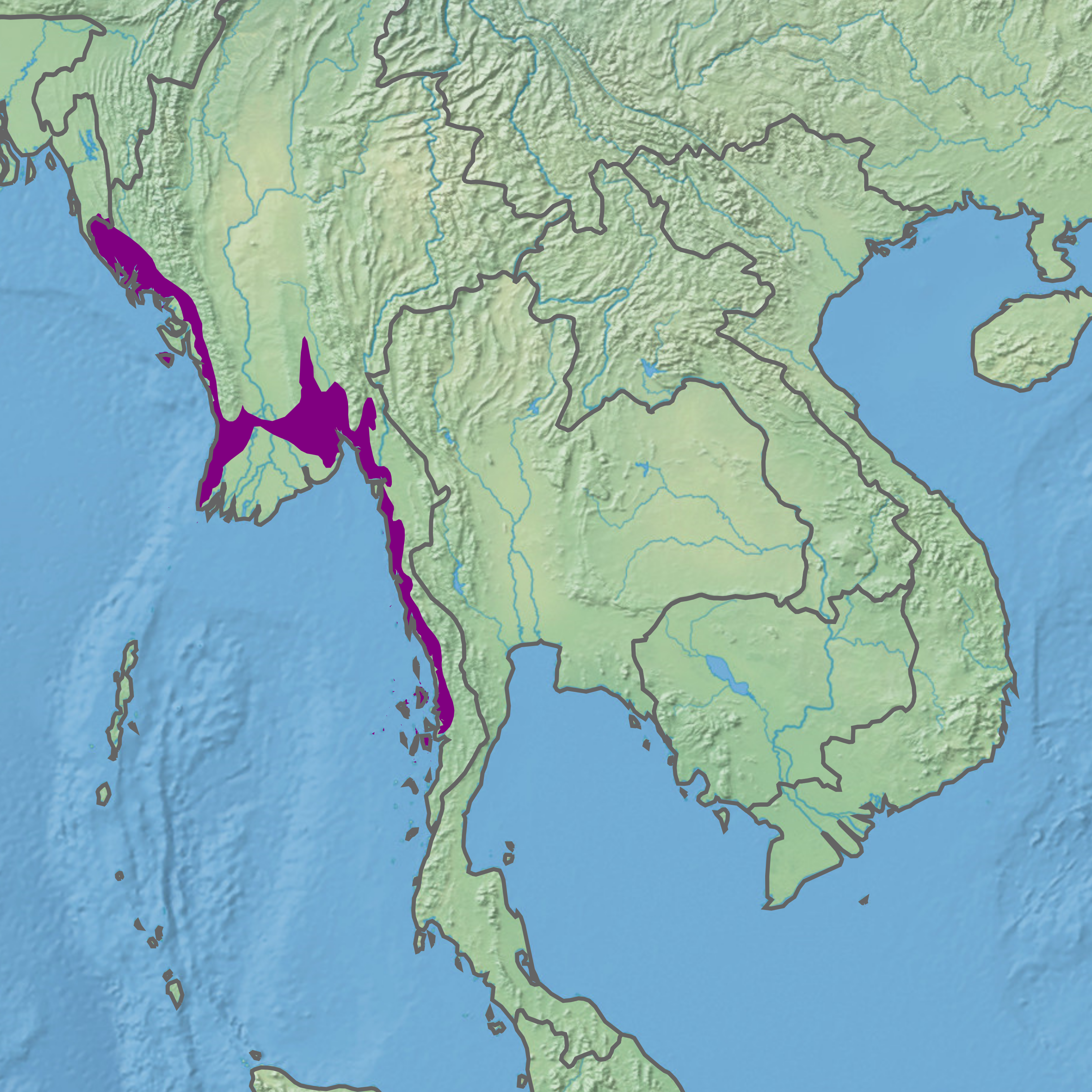
- Ecoregion territory (in purple)

Ecology
- Realm: Indomalayan realm
- Biome: Tropical and subtropical moist broadleaf forests
- Borders: List: Irrawaddy freshwater swamp forests; Irrawaddy moist deciduous forests; Kayah–Karen montane rain forests; Lower Gangetic Plains moist deciduous forests; Mizoram–Manipur–Kachin rain forests; Myanmar Coast mangroves; Tenasserim–South Thailand semi-evergreen rain forests

Geography
- Area: 64,222 km^{2} (24,796 sq mi)
- Countries: Bangladesh; Myanmar
- States and regions: Ayeyarwady Region; Bago Region; Kayin State; Mon State; Rakhine State; Tanintharyi Region; Yangon Region

Conservation
- Conservation status: Vulnerable
- Protected: 3,534 km^{2} (6%)

The Myanmar coastal rain forests is a tropical moist broadleaf forest ecoregion on Mainland Southeast Asia. The ecoregion occupies Myanmar's coastal lowlands along the Andaman Sea and the Bay of Bengal.

== Geography ==
The Myanmar coastal rain forests occupies the coastal lowlands of Myanmar. It extends from the Naf River, which forms the border between Bangladesh and Myanmar, along the Rakhine coast. It also occupies the lower basins of the Irrawaddy and Sittaung rivers, and the coastal lowlands of Mon State and Tanintharyi Region along the Andaman Sea. In Rakhine it is bounded on the east by the Mizoram–Manipur–Kachin rain forests, which occupy the lower slopes of the Arakan Mountains. In the Irrawaddy and Sittaung basins, the Irrawaddy moist deciduous forests lie inland to the north, while the Irrawaddy freshwater swamp forests occupy the wide Irrawaddy Delta to the south. Further east, the Kayah–Karen montane rain forests and Tenasserim–South Thailand semi-evergreen rain forests cover the eastern mountains, and another enclave of the Irrawaddy moist deciduous forests lies in the lower Salween basin. The Myanmar Coast mangroves fringe the coast and river estuaries.

== Climate ==
The climate is humid and tropical. Rainfall is highest during the summer, when Southwest monsoon brings moisture-laden air from the Bay of Bengal.

== Flora ==
The forests are mostly made up of evergreen trees, or semi-evergreen trees which drop some of their leaves during the dry season. Dipterocarps are the predominant trees, and common dipterocarps include Dipterocarpus alatus, D. turbinatus, D. obtusifolius, Anisoptera glabra, Hopea odorata, and Parashorea stellata. Other trees include Swintonia floribunda, Pentace burmanica, Lagerstroemia calyculata, L. floribunda, and L. speciosa. Understory plants include Calamus palms and the creeping bamboo Neohouzeaua helferi.

== Fauna ==
Large mammals in the ecoregion include tiger (Panthera tigris), Asian elephant (Elephas maximus), Malayan tapir (Tapirus indicus), dhole (Cuon alpinus), sun bear (Ursus malayanus), clouded leopard (Pardofelis nebulosa), leopard (Panthera pardus), Asian golden cat (Catopuma temmincki), and gaur (Bos gaurus). Habitat loss and poaching have made large mammals scarce. The Sumatran rhinoceros (Dicerorhinus sumatrensis) was once native to the ecoregion, but Myanmar's last rhinoceros was killed in 1984.

The Burma pipistrelle (Hypsugo lophurus) is an endemic bat, and the disc-footed bat (Eudiscopus denticulus) is a near-endemic.

Over 350 species of birds live in the ecoregion.

== Protected areas ==
A 2017 assessment found that 3,534 km², or 6%, of the ecoregion is in protected areas. About half the unprotected area is still forested.
