= Irrawaddy freshwater swamp forests =

Ecoregion in Myanmar

Ecoregion: Irrawaddy freshwater swamp forests
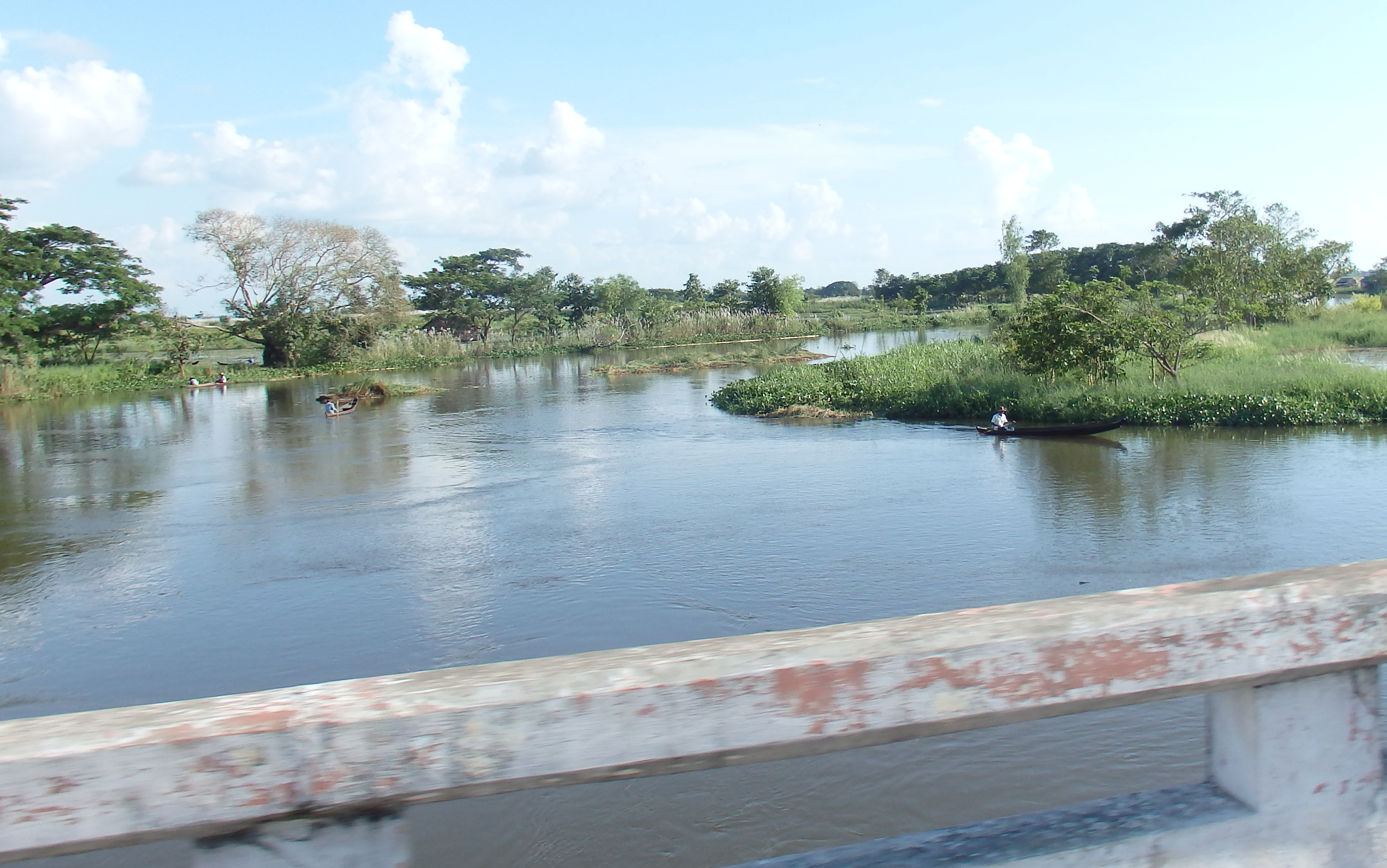
- Maubin, in the Irrawaddy River Delta

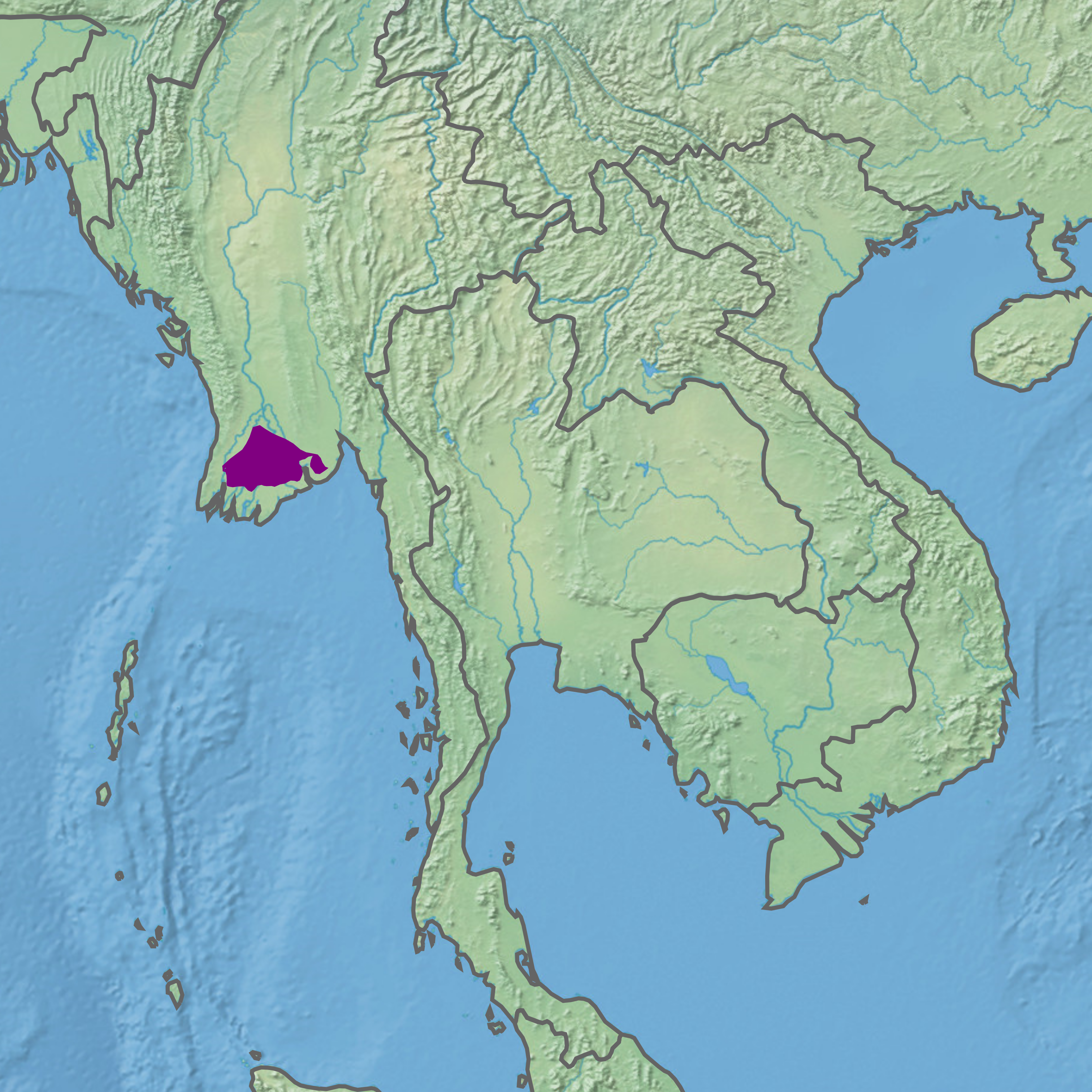
- Ecoregion territory (in purple)

Ecology
- Realm: Indomalayan
- Biome: Tropical and subtropical moist broadleaf forests

Geography
- Area: 15,281 km^{2} (5,900 mi^{2})
- Country: Myanmar
- Coordinates: 16.75°N 95.25°E

The Irrawaddy freshwater swamp forests ecoregion (WWF ID: IM0116) covers the freshwater portion of the delta of the Irrawaddy River, set back an average of 70 km from the Bay of Bengal by the saltwater mangroves. To the north is a rainforest belt with less inundated land. The region is extremely fertile due to the river-borne silt (the Irawaddy Delta is the fifth most heavily silted river in the world), but nearly-total conversion to agriculture has degraded the ecology. There are no fully protected areas in this ecoregion.

== Location and description ==
The ecoregion is flat, measuring about 170 km west-to-east and about 125 km north-to-south. It is bounded on the south by the Myanmar Coast mangroves ecoregion where the saltwater influence of the sea becomes dominant. The belt of mangroves sets the freshwater swamp forest about 70 km back from the Bay of Bengal. The ecoregion transitions to the north into the Myanmar coastal rain forests ecoregion. In the northwest is a small area of high ground at the southern end of the Arakan Mountains. The eastern corner of the region wraps around the capital city of Yangon, which itself is in the mangrove zone.

== Climate ==
The climate of the ecoregion is Tropical savanna climate - dry winter (Köppen climate classification (Aw)). This climate is characterized by relatively even temperatures throughout the year, and a pronounced dry season. The driest month has less than 60 mm of precipitation, and is drier than the average month.

== Flora and fauna ==
Over 80% of the ecoregion is cultivated cropland or permanent water. The small stands of forest are about equally divided between closed and open forest, but these stands are highly fragmented. The common trees are Teak (Tectona grandis), Mai maeng (a variety of Xylia xylocarpa often used in reforestation), Cotton-tree (Bombax ceiba), Ka-jaw (Millettia pendula), (Dalbergia), Wild mango (Spondias pinnata), Bahera (Terminalia balerica), and a variety of other trees. Bamboo (Melocanna bambusoides) is also common.

The region is an important wetland for migratory birds. Notable populations include the relatively common Mongolian plover (Charadrius mongolus), the critically endangered Spoon-billed sandpiper (Eurynorhynchus pygmeus), the near-threatened Black-tailed godwit (Limosa limosa), and the common Asin openbill stork (Anastomus oscitans). The size of visiting populations has been shrinking in recent years.

== Protected areas ==
There are no officially protected areas in this ecoregion.
