= Nattaung =

Mountain in Myanmar

- Location within Myanmar

Highest point
- Elevation: 2,623 m (8,606 ft)
- Prominence: 1,726 m (5,663 ft)
- Listing: List of Ultras of Southeast Asia; Ribu
- Coordinates: 18°48′36″N 97°2′15″E

Geography
- Location: Kayin State, Myanmar
- Parent range: Karen Hills

Climbing
- First ascent: unknown
- Easiest route: climb

Nattaung (Burmese: နတ်တောင်) is the highest mountain of the Karen Hills. It is located in the border area between Kayin State and Kayah State, Burma, 72 kilometres (45 mi) to the west from the border with Thailand. With a height of 2,623 metres (8,606 ft) and a prominence of 1,726 metres (5,663 ft), Nattaung is one of the ultra prominent peaks of Southeast Asia.

== See also ==
- List of ultras of Southeast Asia
- List of mountains in Burma
