= Cyrtodactylus aequalis =

Scientific classification
- Kingdom: Animalia
- Phylum: Chordata
- Class: Reptilia
- Order: Squamata
- Suborder: Gekkota
- Family: Gekkonidae
- Genus: Cyrtodactylus
- Species: C. aequalis

Binomial name
- Cyrtodactylus aequalis Bauer, 2003

Species of lizard

Cyrtodactylus aequalis is a bent-toed gecko species that was discovered in 2001 in Myanmar's Kyaikhtiyo Wildlife Sanctuary and described in 2003.

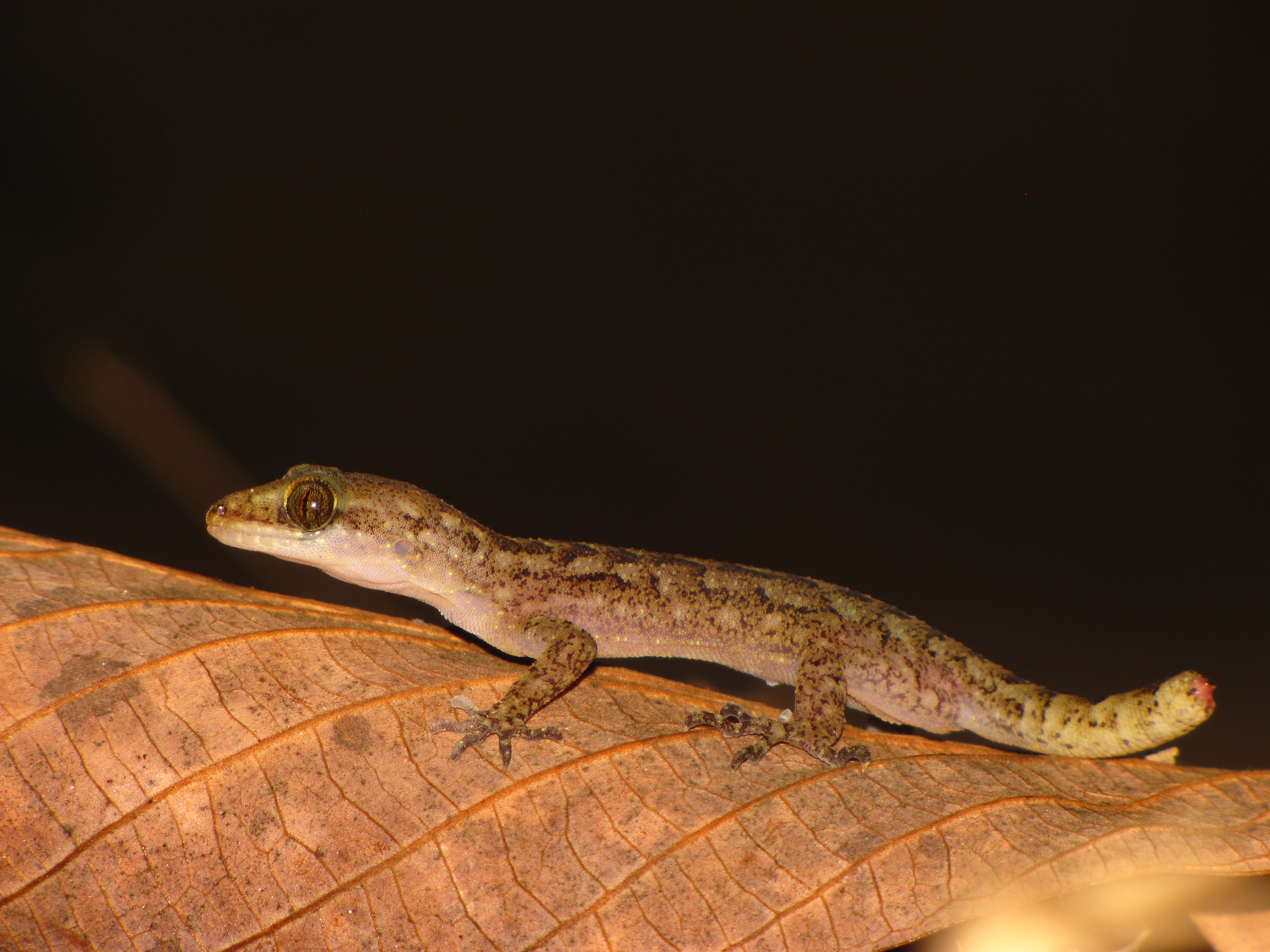
GECKO
