= Tenasserim–South Thailand semi-evergreen rain forests =

Ecoregion on Mainland Southeast Asia

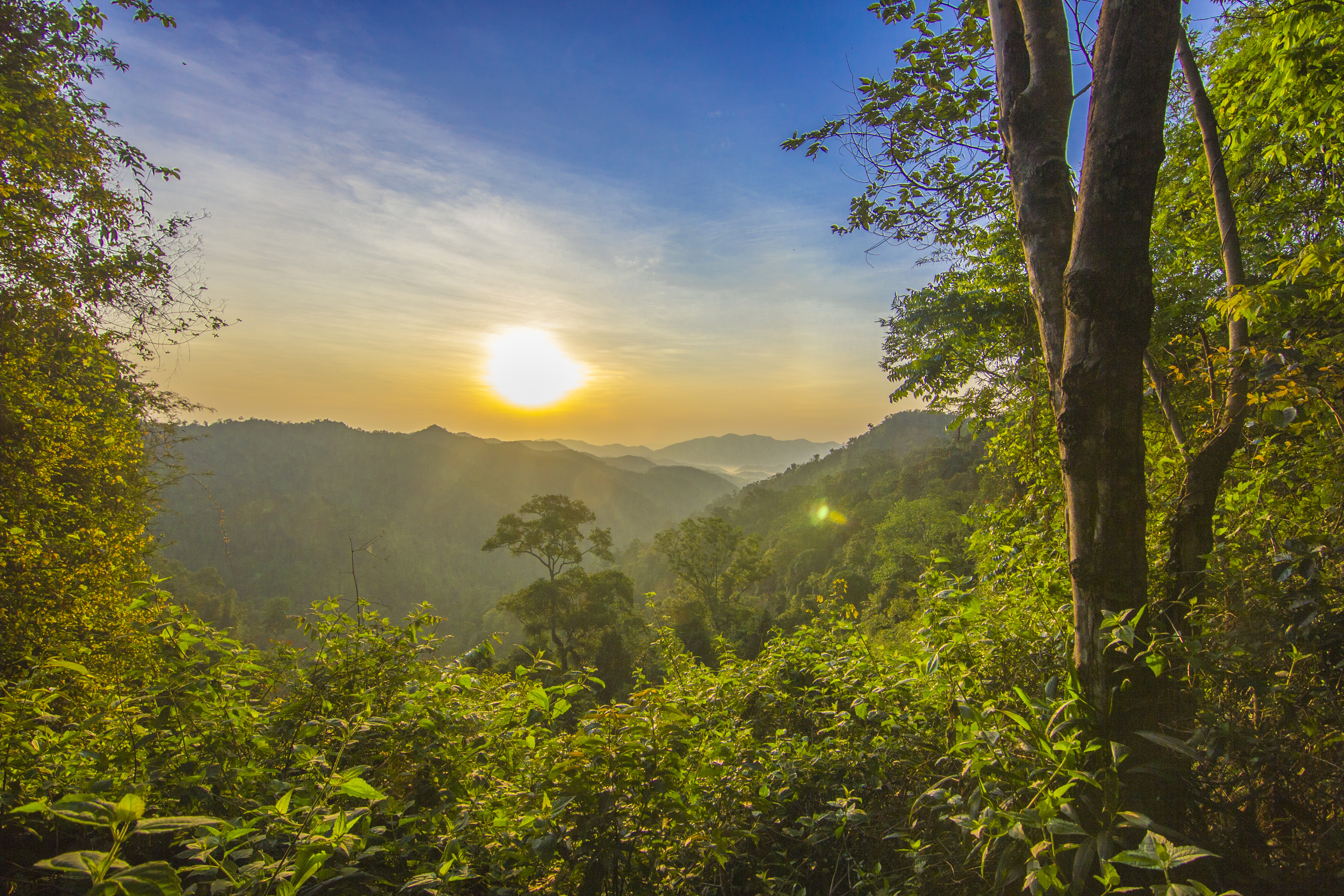
- Kaeng Krachan National Park, Thailand

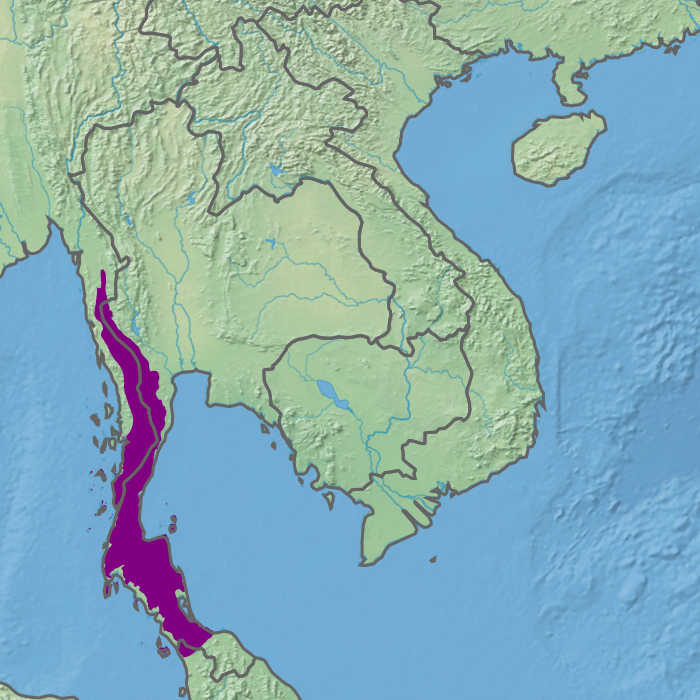
- Ecoregion territory (in purple)

Ecology
- Realm: Indomalayan
- Biome: Tropical and subtropical moist broadleaf forests
- Borders: List: Chao Phraya lowland moist deciduous forests; Indochina mangroves; Irrawaddy moist deciduous forests; Kayah–Karen montane rain forests; Myanmar Coast mangroves; Myanmar coastal rain forests; Peninsular Malaysian rain forests

Geography
- Area: 95,593 km^{2} (36,909 mi^{2})
- Countries: Malaysia; Myanmar; Thailand

Conservation
- Conservation status: Relatively stable/intact
- Protected: 21,105 km^{2} (22%)

The Tenasserim–South Thailand semi-evergreen rain forests is a tropical moist broadleaf forest ecoregion on Mainland Southeast Asia. The ecoregion extends north–south along the Kra Isthmus. It includes lowland forests along the coasts, and montane forests on the Tenasserim Hills and Bilauktaung range, which form the mountainous spine of the isthmus.

== Geography ==
In the northern portion of the ecoregion, it is bounded by other tropical forest ecoregions in the coastal lowlands – the Myanmar coastal rain forests along the Andaman Sea to the west, and the Chao Phraya lowland moist deciduous forests to the east along the Gulf of Thailand. In its southern portion the ecoregion extends all the way to the coast. On the south it is bounded by the Peninsular Malaysian rain forests ecoregion.

== Flora ==
Dipterocarps are the dominant trees, and species vary with elevation and latitude. Semi-evergreen trees that lose some of their leaves during the dry season are common in the lowlands, and evergreen trees are predominant in the montane forests.

The Kangar-Pattani floristic boundary forms the southern end of the ecoregion, and marks the boundary between the mostly deciduous and semi-evergreen forests of Indochina and the mostly evergreen forests of Sundaland and Malesia. South of the boundary rainfall becomes more year-round without as pronounced a dry season.

== Fauna ==
The ecoregion's extensive areas of intact forests support some large mammals, include the Asian elephant (Elephas maximus), tiger (Panthera tigris), gaur (Bos gaurus), banteng (Bos javanicus), sun bear (Helarctos malayanus), leopard (Panthera pardus), clouded leopard (Pardofelis nebulosa), and binturong (Arctictis binturong).

The ecoregion is home to 560 species of birds, including one endemic species, Gurney's pitta (Pitta gurneyi).

== Conservation ==
A 2017 assessment found that 21,105 km^{2}, or 22%, of the ecoregion is in protected areas. Another 72% of the ecoregion is forested but outside protected areas. Protected areas include Ao Phang Nga National Park, Kaeng Krachan National Park, Kaeng Krung National Park, Khao Pu-Khao Ya National Park, Khao Sok National Park, Lenya National Park, Mu Ko Phetra National Park, Tai Romyen National Park, Tanintharyi National Park, Tarutao National Park, and Thale Ban National Park in Thailand.
