= Moe Yin Gyi Reservoir =

- Location within Myanmar
- Location: Bago Division, Burma
- Coordinates: 17°34′44″N 96°35′39″E
- Type: reservoir
- Built: 1978

Moe Yin Gyi Reservoir is a reservoir in the Bago Division in southern-central Burma. It is located at 17°34′44″N 96°35′39″E, north of Pyagyi and Bago. The reservoir was built in 1978 and 11 years later the area became part of the Moneyingyi Wetland Sanctuary. The small town of Pyinbongyi lies on the western side of the lake.
