= Tanintharyi National Park =

Proposed national park in Tanintharyi, Myanmar

- IUCN category II (national park)
- Location within Myanmar
- Location: Tanintharyi Region, Myanmar
- Nearest city: Tanintharyi Township
- Coordinates: 12°41′00″N 99°04′00″E
- Area: 2,072 km^{2} (800 sq mi)
- Governing body: Myanmar Forest Department

Tanintharyi National Park is a proposed national park in Myanmar's Tanintharyi Region that was supposed to cover an area of 2,072 km^{2} (800 sq mi) of mangrove and evergreen forests at an elevation from sea level to 1,490 m (4,890 ft). It was proposed in 2002. Wildlife species in this area include Asian elephant, sambar deer, Malayan tapir, Indian muntjac, and leopard.
