= Panlaung and Padalin Cave Wildlife Sanctuary =

Protected area in Myanmar

- IUCN category IV (habitat/species management area)
- Location within Myanmar
- Location: Ywa Ngan Township, Shan State, Myanmar
- Coordinates: 21°01′N 96°21′E
- Area: 333.8 km^{2} (128.9 sq mi)
- Established: 2002
- Visitors: 103 (in 2014)
- Governing body: Myanmar Forest Department

Panlaung and Padalin Cave Wildlife Sanctuary (Burmese: ပန်းလောင်နှင့် ပြဒါးလင်းဂူ တောရိုင်းတိရစ္ဆာန် ဘေးမဲ့တော) is a protected area in Myanmar's Shan State near Ywangan Township, stretching over an area of 333.8 km^{2} (128.9 sq mi). It was established in 2002 under the Wildlife Protection Act of 1936. In elevation, it ranges from 150 to 1,555 m (492 to 5,102 ft) covering mixed deciduous and dipterocarp forest.

It is located on the western side of the road linking the towns of Myogyi (Burmese: မြို့ကြီး) and Aungpan (Burmese: အောင်ပန်း). The topography of the sanctuary is mostly hilly with undulating hills covered with dense forest. Every year, the sanctuary receives south-west Monsoon rains. The rainfall recorded is up to 78.74 inches (2,000 mm) per year. The sanctuary receives heavy rainfall in June, July and August every year. The Paalaung river flows through the sanctuary. This location is an important watershed for the Kinntarr Dam. The altitude varies from 0.09321 miles (150 m) to 0.9662 miles (1,555 m).

== Plant and Animal Life ==
=== Flora ===
The forest type is Mixed Deciduous Forest (Moist Upper) and Mixed Deciduous Forest (Dry Upper). The Teak (Tectona grandis) and ironwood tree, Mesua ferrea, are the important trees in the forest. The flora includes 148 tree species, 72 herbal plant species, 117 orchid species. The endangered local plants Tapintinemyanan, Tapinshwehti and Thitmwe are found here.

=== Fauna ===
The 265 species of fauna include: 35 mammals, 140 birds, 17 water birds, and 46 reptiles. Vulnerable or endangered species of mammals have been recorded in this protected area, such as the clouded leopard (Neofelis nebulosa), Asian elephant (Elephas maximus), gaur (Bos gaurus), and banteng (Bos javanicus) as well as the near threatened red serow (Capricornis rubidus). The area is also home to the endangered green peacock (Pavo muticus), along with many nonendangered species such as the Asian water monitor (Varanus salvator) and Burmese silver pheasant (Lophura nycthemera).

Wildlife recorded during a camera trap survey in 2000 included leopard (Panthera pardus), leopard cat (Prionailurus bengalensis), Chinese ferret-badger (Melogale moschata), Asian palm civet (Paradoxurus hermaphroditus) and crab-eating mongoose (Herpestes urva).

In 2002, the bent-toed gecko Cyrtodactylus chrysopylos was discovered in the sanctuary at an elevation of 319 m (1,047 ft) and described as a new species in 2003.

== Management ==
This protected area is under the management of Nature and Wildlife Conservation Division (NWCD) governance for monitoring, patrolling, and imparting environmental education. The management office is located in Ywangan town. The forest is managed by 21 official staff which include 1 warden, 4 administrators, 5 forest rangers, 6 forest guards and 2 temporary staff which are all involved in protection of the wildlife area. Four Range Forest Officers of NWCD that were trained abroad or are from international agencies are appointed and are well versed with technical knowledge of the wildlife.

== Tourism ==
The sanctuary is easily accessible to local tourists by car which is 37 kilometres (23 mi) from Kume on Yangon to Mandalay Road. The main attractions are the two limestone Pyadalin caves located in the Panlaung forest reserve. There are paintings, which are over 11,000 years old, on the walls of the caves.

== Threats ==
This area has faced many threats, including tree cutting, hunting, and trading of wild animals. Annual and perennial shifting cultivation practices have led to encroachment, and the wildlife habitat has been damaged by the extraction of water, wood, charcoal, and non-timber forest produce.
