= Kayah–Karen montane rain forests =

Ecoregion on Mainland Southeast Asia

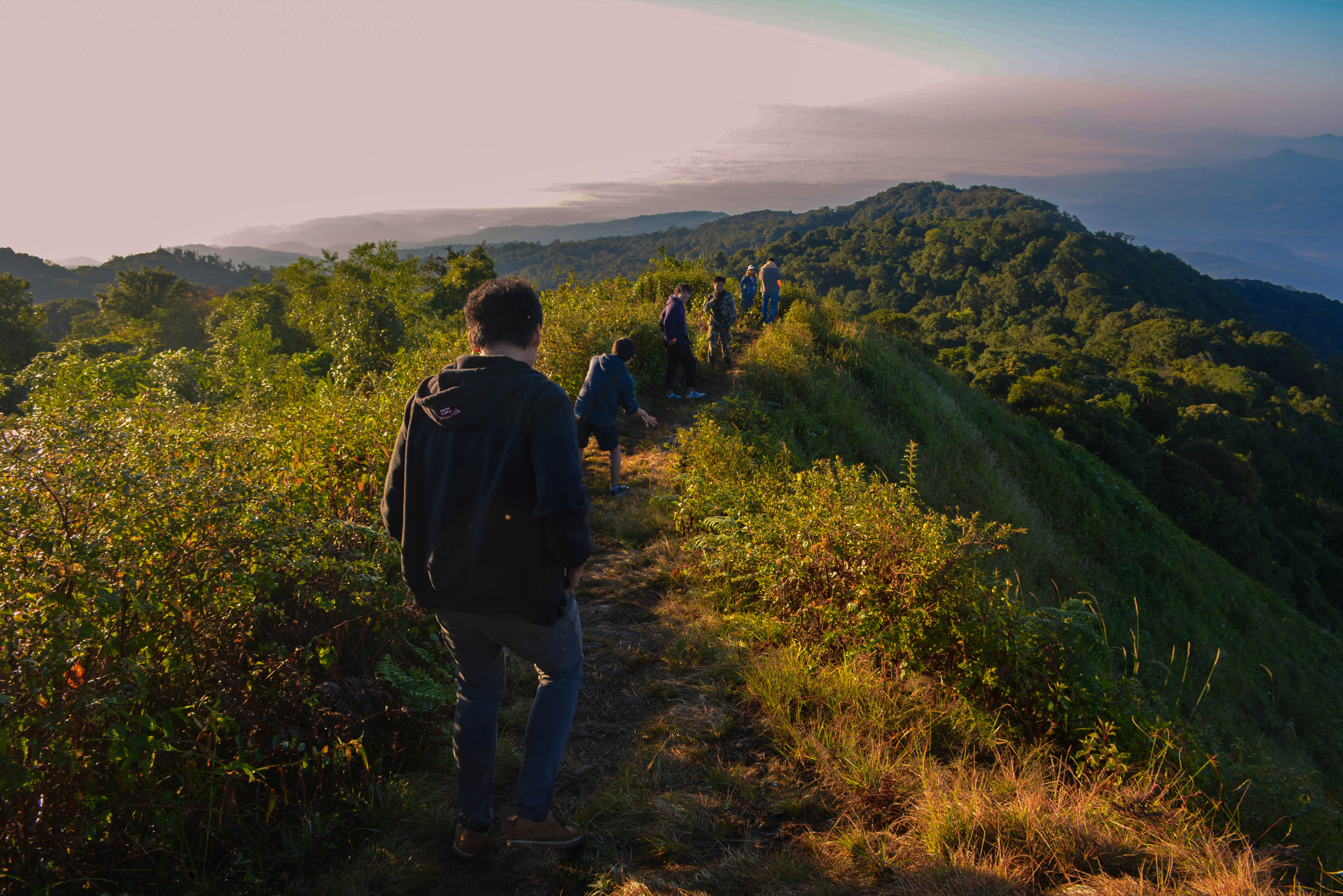
- Ridge top in Doi Pha Hom Pok National Park, Thailand

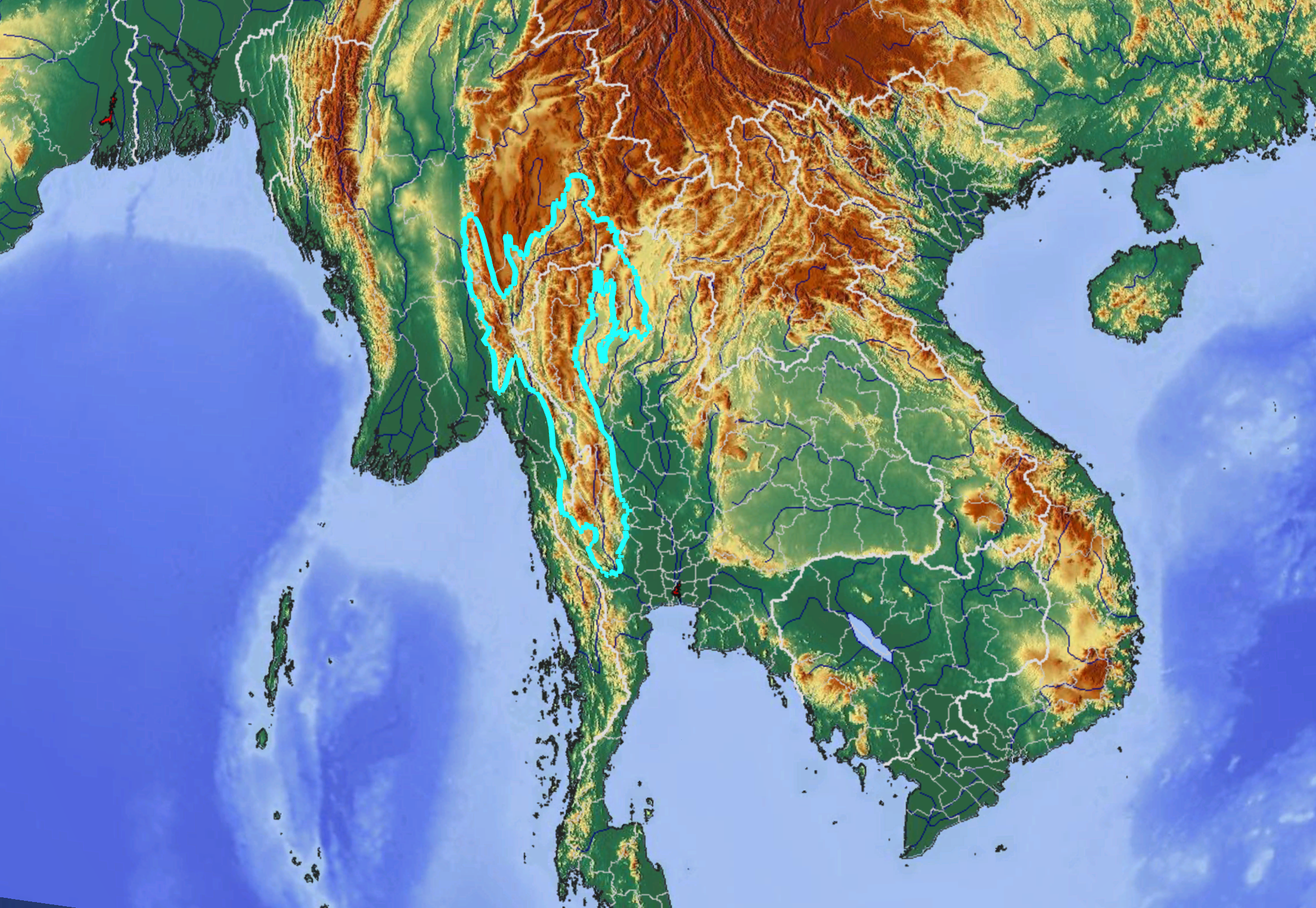
- Ecoregion territory (encircled in turquoise)

Ecology
- Realm: Indomalayan realm
- Biome: Tropical and subtropical moist broadleaf forests
- Borders: List: Central Indochina dry forests; Chao Phraya lowland moist deciduous forests; Irrawaddy dry forests; Irrawaddy moist deciduous forests; Myanmar coastal rain forests; Northern Indochina subtropical forests; Northern Thailand–Laos moist deciduous forests; Tenasserim–South Thailand semi-evergreen rain forests

Geography
- Area: 119,158 km^{2} (46,007 sq mi)
- Countries: Myanmar; Thailand
- Administrative divisions of Myanmar, provinces of Thailand: List: Bago Region; Kayah State; Kayin State; Naypyidaw Union Territory; Shan State; Chiang Mai; Chiang Rai; Kamphaeng Phet; Kanchanaburi; Lampang; Mae Hong Son; Suphan Buri; Tak; Uthai Thani

Conservation
- Conservation status: Relatively stable/intact
- Protected: 32,354 km^{2} (27%)

The Kayah–Karen montane rain forests is a tropical moist broadleaf forest ecoregion on Mainland Southeast Asia. The montane rain forests cover several connected mountain ranges, including the Daen Lao Range, the Dawna Range, the Karen Hills, the Khun Tan Range, and the Thanon Thong Chai Range.

== Geography ==
The Kayah–Karen montane rain forests occupy an area of 119,158 km². The mountain ranges lie in the border region between Myanmar and Thailand. The Dawna, Thanon Thong Chai, Daen Lao, and Khun Tan ranges separate the Salween River basin to the west from that of the Chao Phraya and Mekong rivers on the east. The Karen Hills extend to the northwest, separating the Salween and Sittaung River basins. The ecoregion includes the valley of the Salween River in Kayin, Kayah, and southern Shan states.

== Climate ==
The climate is tropical, with warm humid and rainy summers and dry and mild winters. Average annual rainfall ranges from 1,500 to 2,000 mm. The climate is influenced by the Southwest monsoon coming from the Bay of Bengal, which brings more rain to the westward-facing mountain slopes.

== Flora ==
The ecoregion is at the transition between the tropical monsoon forests of central and southern Indochina and the subtropical forests of northern Indochina. Forest plant communities vary with elevation, latitude, rainfall, and soils. Many trees in the ecoregion belong to the Dipterocarpaceae family.

== Fauna ==
The ecoregion has 168 species of mammals, including several threatened species. Larger mammals include tiger (Panthera tigris), Asian elephant (Elephas maximus), gaur (Bos gaurus), banteng (Bos javanicus), wild water buffalo (Bubalus arnee), Asian black bear (Ursus thibetanus), mainland serow (Capricornis milneedwardsii), clouded leopard (Pardofelis nebulosa), Malayan tapir (Tapirus indicus), dhole (Cuon alpinus), Assam macaque (Macaca assamensis), stump-tailed macaque (Macaca arctoides), smooth-coated otter (Lutrogale perspicillata), great Indian civet (Viverra zibetha), and particoloured flying squirrel (Hylopetes alboniger). The ecoregion has one endemic mammal, Kitti's hog-nosed bat (Craseonycteris thonglongyai).

The ecoregion is home to 568 species of birds, including one endemic species, the Burmese yuhina (Yuhina humilis).

== Protected areas ==
A 2017 assessment found that 32,354 km², or 27%, of the ecoregion is in protected areas. Protected areas include Doi Luang National Park, Erawan National Park, Huai Kha Khaeng Wildlife Sanctuary, Khlong Wang Chao National Park, Khun Chae National Park, Mae Tuen Wildlife Sanctuary, Namtok Mae Surin National Park, Op Luang National Park, Salawin National Park, and Taksin Maharat National Park in Thailand.

== See also ==
- List of trees of northern Thailand
