= Thamihla Kyun Wildlife Sanctuary =

Conservation area in Myanmar

- Burmese: သမီးလှကျွန်း တောရိုင်းတိရစ္ဆာန်ဘေးမဲ့တော
- IUCN category IV (habitat/species management area)
- Location within Myanmar
- Location: Ngaputaw Township, Ayeyarwady Region, Myanmar
- Nearest city: Sumprabom
- Coordinates: 15°51′00″N 94°16′00″E
- Area: 0.88 km^{2} (0.34 sq mi)
- Established: 1970
- Governing body: Myanmar Forest Department

Thamihla Kyun Wildlife Sanctuary is a protected area in Myanmar, located on the 0.88 km^{2} (0.34 sq mi) small uninhabited Diamond Island near the mouth of Pathein River. It was established in 1970 and is part of Ngaputaw Township in Ayeyarwady Region. It is managed by the Forest Department.

Diamond Island is undulating with a coast line of 4.8 km (3.0 mi) consisting of sandy beaches and narrow cliffs running south and west. The highest elevation is approximately 35 m (115 ft). Three rain fed reservoirs provide freshwater. There are about 90 craters from bombs dropped during the Second World War.

== Biodiversity ==
=== Flora ===
Thamihla Kyun Wildlife Sanctuary harbours mixed deciduous and evergreen forest. Hibiscus grow on the beaches. Tree species in the island's forest include beach almond (Terminalia catappa), Casuarina equisetifolia, Coconut (Cocos nucifera), silk-cotton tree (Bombax malabaricum), Ficus benghalensis, Lagerstroemia macrocarpa, Xylia dolabriformis, Terminalia belerica and Lannea grandis. The understorey is composed of evergreen shrubs and bamboo. The southern part of the island is open land with bare rocks interspersed with low vegetation.

=== Fauna ===
Faunal species present in the sanctuary and along the coast mainly include marine species such as olive ridley sea turtle (Lepidochelys olivacea), loggerhead sea turtle (Caretta caretta), green sea turtle (Chelonia mydas), hawksbill sea turtle (Eretmochelys imbricata), and leatherback sea turtle (Dermochelys coriacea). The later two are considered extremely rare. The island beach is mainly calcarious, which is suitable for turtles when laying eggs. As of 1999, about 20,000-30,000 green see turtle eggs and 7,000-15,000 loggerhead sea turtle eggs were estimated on beaches every year.

Asian grass lizard (Takydromus sexlineatus), king cobra (Ophiophagus hannah) and Indian cobra (Naja naja) are present. Birds include brown-headed gull (Chroicocephalus brunnicephalus), black-headed gull (C. ridibundus), white-bellied sea-eagle (Haliaeetus leucogaster), shikra (Accipiter badius), red-whiskered bulbul (Pycnonotus jocosus), white-throated kingfisher (Halcyon smyrnensis), black-hooded oriole (Oriolus xanthornus), Asian koel (Eudynamys scolopaceus), white-breasted waterhen (Amaurornis phoenicurus), common snipe (Gallinago gallinago) and common myna (Acridotheres tristis).
