= Shorea oblongifolia =

Conservation status
- Vulnerable (IUCN 3.1)

Scientific classification
- Kingdom: Plantae
- Clade: Tracheophytes
- Clade: Angiosperms
- Clade: Eudicots
- Clade: Rosids
- Order: Malvales
- Family: Dipterocarpaceae
- Genus: Shorea
- Species: S. oblongifolia

Binomial name
- Shorea oblongifolia Thwaites

Species of tree

Shorea oblongifolia is a species of flowering plant in the family Dipterocarpaceae. It is a tree endemic to Sri Lanka.

== Culture ==
Known as බෙරලිය (beraliya) in Sinhala.
