= Mahamyaing Wildlife Sanctuary =

Protected area in Myanmar

- Burmese: မဟာမြိုင် တောရိုင်းတိရစ္ဆာန်ဘေးမဲ့တော
- IUCN category IV (habitat/species management area)
- Location within Myanmar
- Location: Sagaing Region, Kalay and Mawlaik Townships, MyanmarMyanmar
- Nearest city: Mawlaik
- Coordinates: 23°21′00″N 94°40′00″E
- Area: 1,181 km^{2} (456 sq mi)
- Established: 2002
- Governing body: Myanmar Forest Department

Mahamyaing Wildlife Sanctuary is a protected area in Myanmar's Sagaing Region, covering an area of 1,181 km^{2} (456 sq mi). It ranges in elevation from 145 to 590 m (476 to 1,936 ft) and was established in 2002 in Kalay and Mawlaik Townships.

== History ==
The area of Mahamyaing Wildlife Sanctuary used to be five reserve forest blocks with logging concessions. In 2002, it was proposed as a wildlife sanctuary, and forest rangers were employed. It was designated an Important Bird Area in 2010.

== Biodiversity ==
=== Flora ===
Mahamyaing Wildlife Sanctuary encompasses mostly mixed deciduous forest interspersed with some evergreen forest species. The forest is degraded and dry dipterocarp in the sanctuary's buffer zone. The tree species include Teak (Tectona grandis), Pterocarpus macrocarpus, Xylia dolabriformis, and Shorea siamensis.

=== Fauna ===
Wildlife recorded during a camera trap survey in the winter of 1999 to 2000 comprised yellow-throated marten (Martes flavigula), large Indian civet (Viverra zibetha), small Indian civet (Viverricula indica), clouded leopard (Neofelis nebulosa), Asiatic golden cat (Catopuma temminckii) and leopard cat (Prionailurus bengalensis). Also present are Asian elephant (Elephas maximus), banteng (Bos javanicus), gaur (Bos gaurus), sambar deer (Cervus unicolor), Indian muntjac (Muntiacus muntjak), wild boar (Sus scrofa), eastern hoolock gibbon (Hoolock leuconedys), Rhesus macaque (Macaca mulatta), Asiatic wild dog (Cuon alpinus), Javan mongoose (Herpestes javanicus) and jungle cat (Felis chaus). The critically endangered Chinese pangolin (Manis pentadactyla) and Sunda pangolin(Manis javanica) occur as well as more than 86 bird species and 74 butterfly species.
