= Pyin-O-Lwin Bird Sanctuary =

Protected area in Myanmar

- Burmese: ပြင်ဦးလွင် ငှက်ဘေးမဲ့တော
- IUCN category IV (habitat/species management area)
- Location within Myanmar
- Location: Mandalay Region, Pyinoolwin Township, Myanmar
- Nearest city: Pyin-O-Lwin
- Coordinates: 22°00′00″N 96°30′00″E
- Area: 127.25 km^{2} (49.13 sq mi)
- Established: 1918
- Governing body: Forest Department, Ministry of Natural Resources and Environmental Conservation

Pyin-O-Lwin Bird Sanctuary is a protected area in Myanmar's Pyinoolwin Township in Mandalay Region covering an area of 127.25 km^{2} (49.13 sq mi). It was gazetted in 1918 and spans an elevation of 975–1,210 m (3,199–3,970 ft). It is one of four protected wetlands.

== Description ==
This sanctuary is near the town of Pyin-O-Lwin. The road linking Anesakhan (Burmese: အနီးစခန်း) and Lashio (Burmese: ပွင့်ဖြူ) towns passes through the sanctuary. It receives south-west monsoon rains of about 1,000 mm (39 in) every year from June to August.

== Biodiversity ==
Pyin-O-Lwin Bird Sanctuary harbours evergreen hill forest. Wildlife present include green peafowl (Pavo muticus), grey peacock pheasant (Polyplectron bicalcaratum) and barking deer (Muntiacus muntjak).

== History ==
Pyin-O-Lwin Bird Sanctuary was gazetted in 1918. It was established in 1927. As of 2017, it is managed by the Forest Department.

== Tourism ==
Pyin-O-Lwin town is a favourite destination for the tourist since, it is located on the main road and railway line from Mandalay to Lashio. Many tourist attractions like National Kandawgyi Gardens (Burmese: အမျိုးသားကန်တော်ကြီးဥယျာဉ်), flower garden have resulted in need to develop Pyin-O-Lwin Bird sanctuary. Regular educated forest staff is in need to direct the local and foreign tourist visiting the sanctuary.

== Threats ==
1. Logging
2. Fishing
3. Hunting and trading of wildlife
4. Shifting cultivation practices have led to encroachment
5. Extraction of water, fuel wood, charcoal and non-timber forest produce is depriving wildlife habitat
