= Kelatha Wildlife Sanctuary =

Protected area in Myanmar

- IUCN category IV (habitat/species management area)
- Location within Myanmar
- Location: Bilin Township, Mon State, Myanmar
- Nearest city: Belin
- Coordinates: 17°13′00″N 97°7′00″E
- Area: 22.45 km^{2} (8.67 sq mi)
- Established: 1942
- Governing body: Myanmar Forest Department

Kelatha Wildlife Sanctuary (Burmese: ကေလာသ တောရိုင်းတိရစ္ဆာန် ဘေးမဲ့တော, alternatively spelt as Kaylartha Widlife Sanctuary) is a protected area in Myanmar stretching over 22.45 km^{2} (8.67 sq mi). It was established in 1942. It harbours evergreen and mixed deciduous forest with elevations ranging from 0 to 355 m (1,165 ft) in Bilin Township, Mon State. The sanctuary is administered from Bilin.

== Location ==
This sanctuary is near to the town of Taung Zun which is 32 km (20 mi) from the town of Belin. The sanctuary is located on the western side of the Railway line linking Taung Sun and Kyaik Hto railway stations. There are roads all along the boundary of the sanctuary. The topography of the sanctuary is mostly flat with few undulating hills.

== Description ==
The sanctuary receives south-west Monsoon rains every year. The rainfall recorded is about 3,800 mm (150 in) per year. The sanctuary receives heavy rainfall in June, July and August every year.

The Shwe Parami Forest Monastery and the Kaylartha Pagoda is a famous pilgrimage site on the hillock inside the sanctuary. The Keltha Pagoda is situated on 1,181 ft (360 m) high mountain on the edge of the Sittaung lowland Valley. The seaside view from the mountain has made it a major tourism destination.

The area of the sanctuary was 24 km^{2} (9.3 sq mi). However the area has been reduced to 5,548.473 acres (22 km^{2}) due to the degazettement of 44.81 acres (18.13 ha) for a Prison Department housing complex and 454.717 acres (1.8 km^{2}) acres of mining area for the Taung Zun quarry mine.

In 2016, a rock and quarry project aimed at producing rock suitable for road paving was suspended on Kaylatha Mountain after inspection from the Ministry of Natural Resources and Environmental Conservation. The minister, Ohn Win, placed a temporary ban on mining within the sanctuary. Eventually, quarry projects were permitted to operate only along the boundaries area as they had historically been quarry sites.

== Biodiversity ==
The prevailing forest type in Kelatha Wildlife Sanctuary is mixed deciduous forest and evergreen forest. Teak (Tectona grandis), Antiaris toxicaria, Mesua ferrea, Pygeum anomalum, Ficus oligodon, Diospyros discolor, Baccaurea flaccida, Dipterocarpus alatus are the important tree species. Amherstia nobilis is endemic to Myanmar.

In 1996, Sambar deer (Rusa unicolor), wild boar (Sus scrofa), serow and barking deer species were reported to occur in Kelatha Wildlife Sanctuary. Its fauna comprises 69 bird species, 17 mammals, 71 butterfly species, 12 beetle species and 14 reptile species.
