= Sami, Paletwa =

Sami ဆမီး
- Town
- Location within Myanmar
- Coordinates: 21°17′36″N 93°05′47″E
- Country: Myanmar
- State: Chin State
- District: Matupi District
- Township: Paletwa Township

Population (2014)
  - Town: 32,082
  - Urban: 3,032
  - Rural: 29,050
- Time zone: UTC+6:30 (MST)

Sami (Burmese: ဆမီး; also spelt Sami) is a town located in Matupi District, Chin State of Myanmar (Burma). It is the administrative seat of Sami sub-township.
