= Paletwa District =

Coordinates: 21°18′N 92°51′E

Paletwa District Paletwa Township ပလက်ဝခရိုင် ပလက်ဝမြို့နယ်
- Township and District
- Location in Paletwa District in Chin State (red)
- Country: Myanmar
- State: Chin State
- Capital: Paletwa

Area
  - Township and District: 3,127.04 sq mi (8,099.0 km^{2})
- Elevation: 179 ft (55 m)

Population (2014)
  - Township and District: 64,971
  - Density: 20.777/sq mi (8.0221/km^{2})
  - Urban: 6,374
  - Rural: 58,597
- Time zone: UTC+6:30 (MMT)

Paletwa Township (Burmese: ပလက်ဝမြို့နယ်) is the only township of Paletwa District (Burmese: ပလက်ဝခရိုင်) in southwestern Chin State, Myanmar. It consists of Paletwa and Sami towns and Paletwa is the administrative center for the township. During British rule, Paletwa District was formerly known as Arakan Hill Tracts as part of Arakan Division until formation of Chin State in 1974.

On January 14, 2024, during the Rakhine offensive, the township has been fully taken control by the Arakan Army.

== Geography ==
Paletwa Township is located in the southernmost part of Chin State. Its area is 3,127.04 sq mi (8,099.0 km^{2}).

== Borders ==
Paletwa Township borders on:

- Kanpetlet Township and Mindat Township to the east;
- Matupi Township to the northeast;
- Kyauktaw Township, Minbya Township and Mrauk-U Township of Rakhine State to the south;
- Buthidaung Township of Rakhine State, and Bangladesh to the west; and
- India to the north.
