= Kyaikhtiyo Wildlife Sanctuary =

Protected area in Myanmar

- IUCN category III (natural monument or feature)
- Location within Myanmar
- Location: Kyaikto Township, Mon State, Myanmar
- Nearest city: Kyaikhto
- Coordinates: 17°28′00″N 97°05′00″E
- Area: 156.21 km^{2} (60.31 sq mi)
- Established: 2001
- Visitors: 1000000 (in 2014)
- Governing body: Myanmar Forest Department

Kyaikhtiyo Wildlife Sanctuary is a protected area in Myanmar, stretching over 156.21 km^{2} (60.31 sq mi). It covers evergreen and mixed deciduous forests an elevation of 50–1,090 m (160–3,580 ft) in Kyaikto Township. It was established in 2001 to conserve the biodiversity around the Kyaiktiyo Pagoda, a famous pilgrimage site in Mon State.

It is managed by the Nature and Wildlife Conservation Division.

== Biodiversity ==
The Indo-Pacific gecko (Hemidactylus garnotii) occurs in the sanctuary. In 2001, the bent-toed gecko Cyrtodactylus aequalis was discovered in the sanctuary and described as a new species in 2003.

Key wildlife species are the tiger (Panthera tigris), leopard (Panthera pardus), serow (Capricornis milneedwardsiiare), red goral (Naemorhedus baileyi), Sambar deer (Rusa unicolor), Indian muntjac (Muntiacus muntjak), gaur (Bos gaurus) and wild boar (Sus scrofa).

== Threats ==
Kyaikhtiyo Wildlife Sanctuary is threatened by illegal logging, harvesting of fire wood and hunting of wildlife for subsistence.
