= Sein Ye Forest Park =

Forest park in Myanmar

- IUCN category IV (habitat/species management area)
- Location within Myanmar
- Location: Oaktwin Township, Bago Division, Burma
- Coordinates: 18°27′N 96°07′E
- Area: 102 acres (0.41 km^{2})
- Established: 1996

Sein Ye Forest Park is a forest park of Burma. It is located in Oaktwin Township in Bago Division. It occupies an area of 102 acres (0.41 km^{2}) and was established in 1996.
