= Lawkananda Wildlife Sanctuary =

- Burmese: လောကနန္ဒာ တောရိုင်းတိရစ္ဆာန်ဘေးမဲ့တော
- IUCN category IV (habitat/species management area)
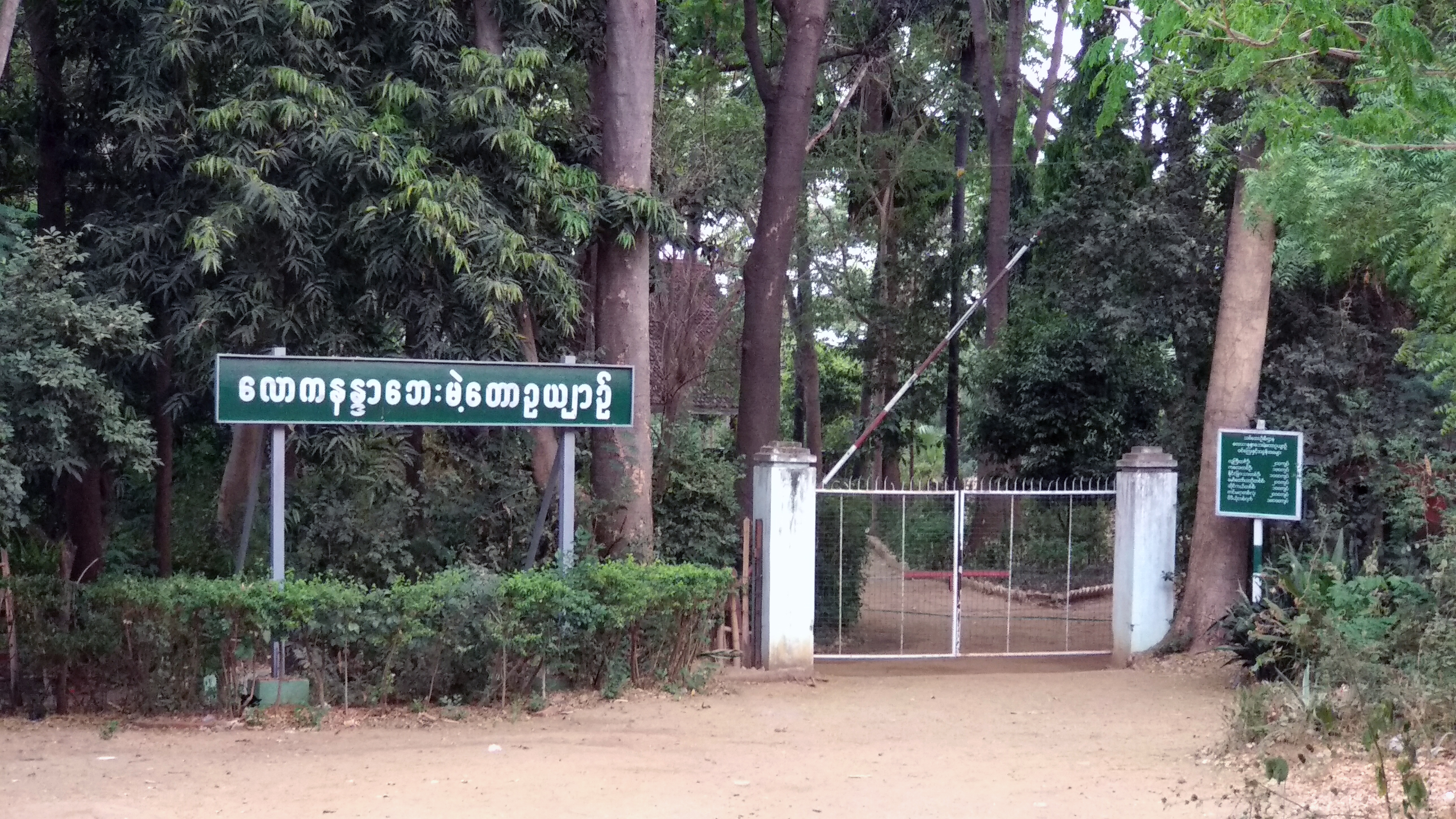

- Location within Myanmar
- Location: Mandalay Region, Myanmar Myanmar
- Nearest city: Bagan Burmese: ပုဂံမြို့သစ်
- Coordinates: 21°07′00″N 94°51′00″E
- Area: 0.47 km^{2} (0.18 sq mi)
- Established: 1995
- Visitors: 55959 (in 2014)
- Governing body: Myanmar Forest Department

Lawkananda Wildlife Sanctuary is a protected area in Myanmar's Mandalay Region, covering an area of 0.47 km^{2} (0.18 sq mi) and ranging in elevation from 45 to 70 m (148 to 230 ft). It borders the Irrawaddy River close to Bagan and was established in 1995.

== History ==
Lawkananda Wildlife Sanctuary was established in 1995 for the conservation of dry forest. It is managed by a warden, rangers and foresters, who patrol the area and implement measures to protect the forest against floods and fire. In 2014, about 56,000 people visited the sanctuary.

== Biodiversity ==
=== Flora ===
In 2015, 80 tree species, 160 species of medicinal plants, four bamboo species and 32 species of flowering plants were identified in Lawkananda Wildlife Sanctuary. The forest type is dry deciduous forest. The tree species include Teak (Tectona grandis), Pterocarpus macrocarpus, Xylia dolabriformis, and Shorea siamensis.

=== Fauna ===
Lawkananda Wildlife Sanctuary harbours sambar deer (Cervus unicolor), Indian muntjac (Muntiacus muntjak), Indian hog deer (Hyelaphus porcinus), Eld's deer (Panolia eldii) and Burmese star tortoise (Geochelone platynota).

== Threats ==
Lawkananda Wildlife Sanctuary's habitat is threatened by illicit logging, hunting and fishing of wildlife, fires during the dry season, extraction of water, fuel wood, grass and non-timber forest products.
