= Minwuntaung Wildlife Sanctuary =

Protected area in Myanmar

- IUCN category IV (habitat/species management area)
- Location within Myanmar
- Location: Sagaing Township, Sagaing Region, Myanmar
- Nearest city: Sagaing
- Coordinates: 22°03′00″N 95°57′00″E
- Area: 205.88 km^{2} (79.49 sq mi)
- Established: 1971
- Governing body: Myanmar Forest Department

Minwuntaung Wildlife Sanctuary is a protected area in Myanmar, covering 205.88 km^{2} (79.49 sq mi). It was established in 1971. It ranges in elevation from 75 to 305 m (246 to 1,001 ft) in Sagaing Township, Sagaing Region. It provides habitat for Indian hog deer (Hyelaphus porcinus) and Indian muntjac (Muntiacus muntjak).

== See also ==
- Ministry of Environmental Conservation and Forestry (Myanmar)
