= Moeyungyi Wetland Wildlife Sanctuary =

Protected area in Myanmar

Moe Yun Gyi Wetland Wildlife Sanctuary
- IUCN category IV (habitat/species management area)
- Location within Myanmar
- Location: Bago Division, Burma
- Coordinates: 17°32′N 96°35′E
- Area: 103.6 km^{2} (40.0 sq mi)
- Established: 1988

Ramsar Wetland
- Official name: Moe Yun Gyi Wetland Wildlife Sanctuary
- Designated: 17 November 2004
- Reference no.: 1431

Moeyungyi Wetland Wildlife Sanctuary is a protected area in Myanmar's Bago Division, covering an area of 103.6 km^{2} (40.0 sq mi). It was established in 1988 and gained the status of an Important Bird Area in 2003.

The wetland encompasses the Moe Yin Gyi Reservoir, short and tall grasslands, patches with planted trees, rice and lotus fields at an elevation of 0–30 m (0–98 ft). During a survey in the winter of 2014–2015, 52 bird species were recorded including black-headed ibis (Threskiornis melanocephalus), painted stork (Mycteria leucocephala), Oriental darter (Anhinga melanogaster), great egret (Ardea alba), cattle egret (Bubulcus ibis), intermediate egret (Mesophoyx intermedia), little egret (Egretta garzetta), Asian openbill (Anastomus oscitans), lesser whistling-duck (Dendrocygna javanica), pygmy goose (Nettapus coromandelianus), purple swamphen (Porphyrio porphyria), pheasant-tailed jacana (Hydrophasianus chirurgus), Northern pintail (Anas acuta), little cormorant (Phalacrocorax niger), little grebe (Tachybaptus ruficollis), osprey (Pandion haliaetus), pied harrier (Circus melanoleucos), eastern marsh harrier (Circus spilonotus) and black drongo (Dicrurus macrocercus).
