= Popa Mountain National Park =

National park in Myanmar

- Burmese: ပုပ္ပားတောင်အမျိုးသားဥယျာဉ်
- IUCN category II (national park)
- Location within Myanmar
- Location: Kyaukpadaung Township, Mandalay Region, Myanmar
- Coordinates: 20°55′N 95°15′E
- Area: 50 mi^{2} (130 km^{2})
- Established: 1989
- Governing body: Nature and Wildlife Conservation Division

Popa Mountain National Park is a national park in Myanmar covering 50 mi^{2} (130 km^{2}). It was established in 1989. In elevation, it ranges from 935 to 4,888 ft (285 to 1,490 m) surrounding Mount Popa in Kyaukpadaung Township, Mandalay Region.
