= Kahilu Wildlife Sanctuary =

- IUCN category IV (habitat/species management area)
- Location within Myanmar
- Location: Phapun Township and Paan Township, Kayin State, Myanmar
- Nearest city: Sumprabom
- Coordinates: 17°32′00″N 97°30′00″E
- Area: 160.58 km^{2} (62.00 sq mi)
- Established: 1928
- Governing body: Ministry of Natural Resources and Environmental Conservation, Forest Department

Kahilu Wildlife Sanctuary is a protected area in Myanmar's Kayin State. It was established in 1928 and covers 160.58 km^{2} (62.00 sq mi). It is mostly flat with elevation ranging from 20 to 260 m (66 to 853 ft). Annual precipitation is about 3,800 mm (150 in).

== History ==
Kahilu Wildlife Sanctuary was established in 1928 for the protection of one of the last Javan rhinoceros (Rhinoceros sondaicus) families in the country. As of 2011, it was not managed due to security issues. The Forest Department is the responsible management authority.

== Biodiversity ==
Most of Kahilu Wildlife Sanctuary is covered by mixed deciduous forest, consisting of teak (Tectona grandis) and iron wood (Mesua ferrea) trees. Indian hog deer (Hyelaphus porcinus), lesser mouse-deer (Tragulus kanchil) and serow (Capricornis milneedwardsii) live in this protected area. Bird species include jungle fowl, hornbill, myna, parakeets, doves, partridge, lapwing, drongos, kite and owl.

== Threats ==
Kahilu Wildlife Sanctuary is threatened by shifting cultivation practices, collection of non-timber forest products and hunting of wildlife. It will likely be flooded if a planned dam is constructed near the confluence of Salween and Moei Rivers.
