= Myanmar Coast mangroves =

Ecoregion in Burma, Malaysia, Thailand and Bangladesh

Ecoregion: Myanmar Coast mangroves
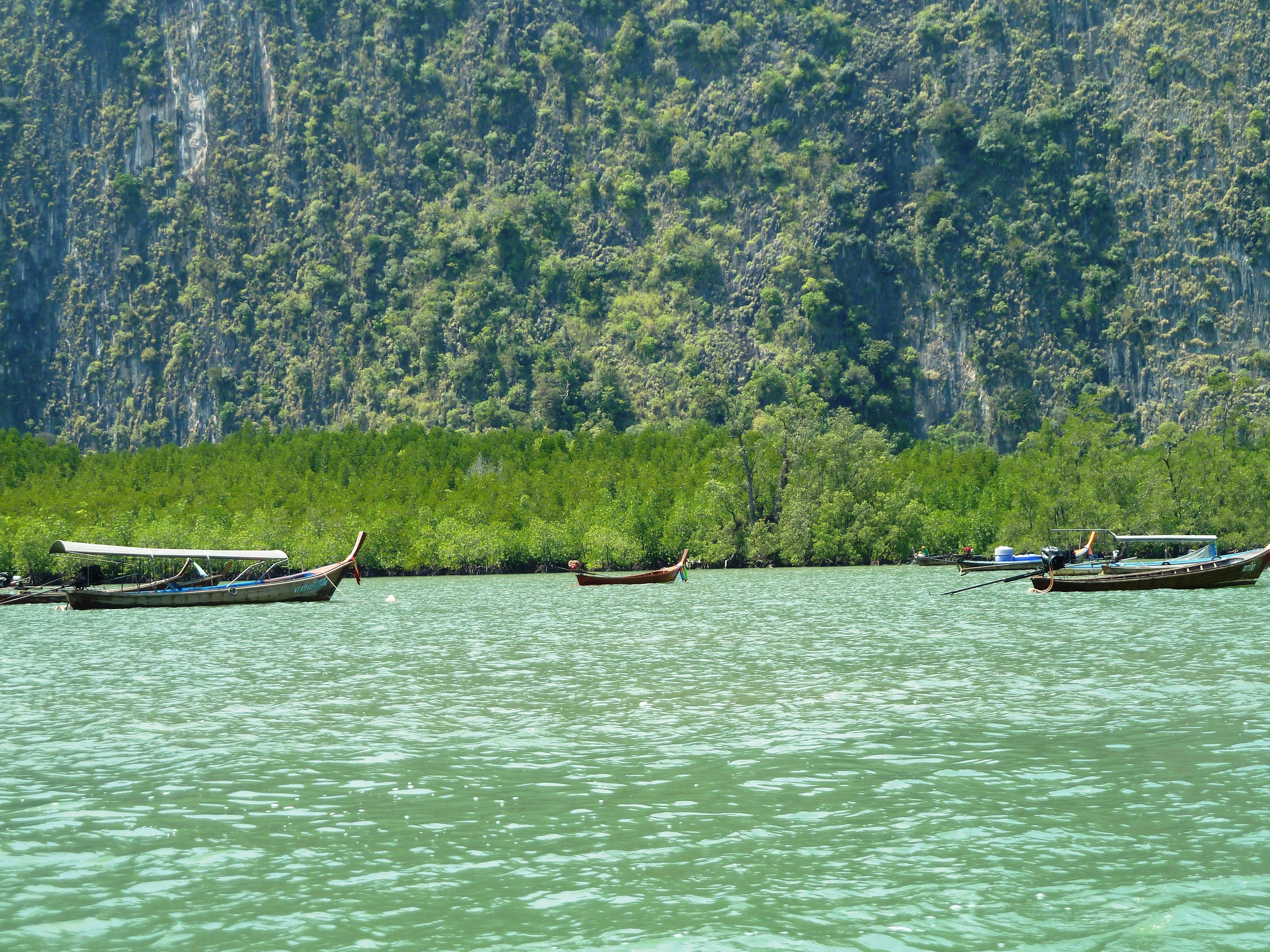
- Mangroves in Ao Phang Nga National Park

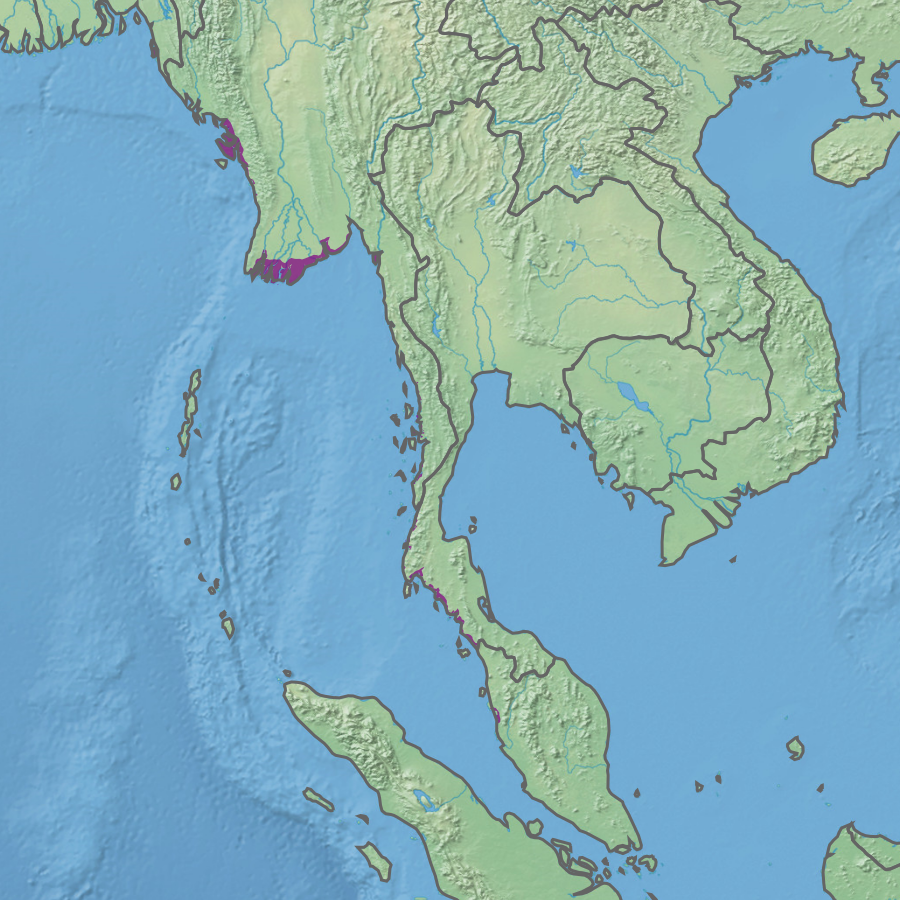
- Ecoregion territory (in purple)

Ecology
- Realm: Indomalayan
- Biome: Mangrove

Geography
- Country: Malaysia, Thailand, Myanmar, Bangladesh
- Coordinates: 10°N 106.25°E

The Burmese or Myanmar Coast mangroves are an ecoregion in Burma, Malaysia, Thailand and Bangladesh where there were once thick forests of mangroves but today most has been cleared, resulting in loss of habitat for wildlife.

== Location and description ==
Mangroves were once common in the Irrawaddy River Delta and today exist in three distinct areas, Rakhine State, Ayeyarwady and Tanintharyi Regions, as well as Kutubdia and Moheshkhali islands in Bangladesh

== Flora ==
The mangrove flora of Burma include Rhizophora and Xylocarpus mangrove trees, Sonneratias, other Rhizophoraceae, Nypa fruticans and Phoenix paludosa.

== Fauna ==
The remaining mammals include a small group of wild Asian elephants in Rakhine State, while once common species of mammals and reptiles such as the tiger, the saltwater crocodile (Crocodylus porosus) and the mangrove terrapin (Batagur baska) have either disappeared or seriously reduced in number

Bird life however is much richer including waterbirds such as Oriental darter (Anhinga melanogaster), little cormorant (Phalacrocorax nigers), Pacific reef heron (Egretta sacra), great-billed heron (Ardea sumatrana), ruddy shelduck (Tadorna ferruginea), bronze-winged jacana (Metopidius indicus), lesser sand plover (Charadrius mongolus), beach stone-curlew (Esacus magnirostris), black-winged stilt (Himantopus himantopus), Nordmann's greenshank (Tringa guttifer), lesser black-backed gull (Larus fuscus) and common moorhen (Gallinula chloropus).

== Threats and preservation ==
This is Asia's most depleted area of mangroves, a particularly vulnerable ecosystem. The mangroves have been depleted by increased sediment being brought to the coast by the Irrawaddy, this is a natural process but has accelerated in recent decades following deforestation in inland Myanmar. The mangroves have been even more seriously affected by the large-scale cutting of mangrove trees themselves for timber and to clear land for agriculture and coastal development, all of which is ongoing often illegally. This leaves the remaining mangroves in serious need of protection and planned and existing protected areas include Mein-ma-hla Kyun Wildlife Sanctuary.

As of 2019 in Myanmar, the cutting down of mangroves to turn into charcoal for sale in China and Thailand continues unabated.
