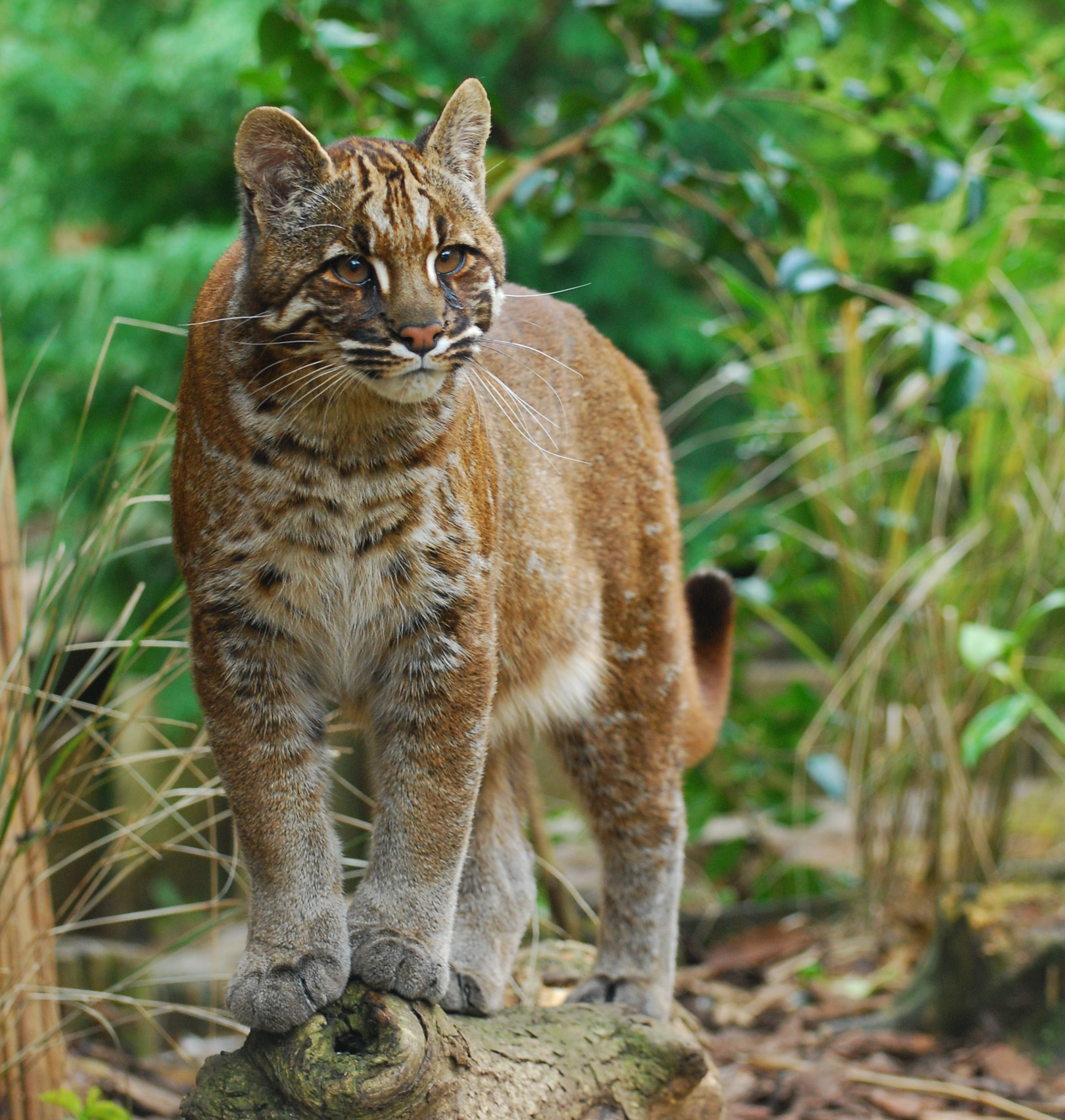

Conservation status
- Vulnerable (IUCN 3.1)
- CITES Appendix I

Scientific classification
- Kingdom: Animalia
- Phylum: Chordata
- Class: Mammalia
- Order: Carnivora
- Family: Felidae
- Genus: Catopuma
- Species: C. temminckii

Binomial name
- Catopuma temminckii (Vigors & Horsfield, 1827)
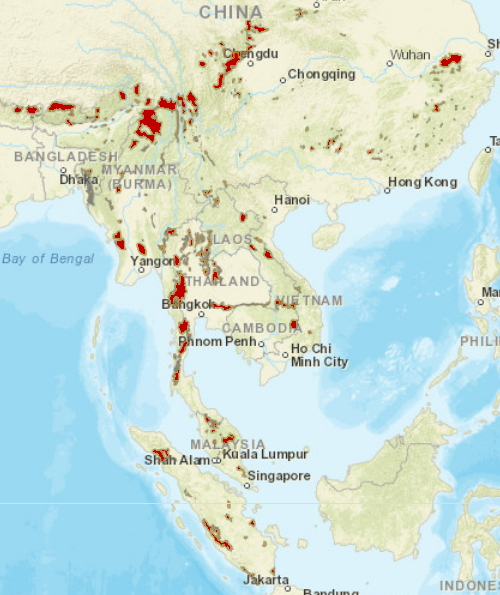
- Distribution of the Asian golden cat, 2015

Synonyms
- Pardofelis temminckii

= Asian golden cat =

Species of wild cat

The Asian golden cat (Catopuma temminckii) also known as Asiatic golden cat and Temminck's cat, is a medium-sized wild cat. It has a head-to-body length of 66–105 cm (26–41 in), a 40–57 cm (16–22 in) long tail, and is 56 cm (22 in) tall at the shoulder. Its weight ranges from 9 to 16 kg (20 to 35 lb), with males generally being larger than females. It is highly polymorphic, occurring in reddish, golden, cinnamon, gray, brown, ocelot and melanistic morphs.

The Asian golden is native to the northeastern Indian subcontinent, Southeast Asia and southern China. It is highly adaptable to a variety of forested environments such as tropical and subtropical moist evergreen forests, mixed deciduous forests, and occasionally more open habitats like bamboo thickets and shrublands. Primarily a solitary and terrestrial animal, it is a climber capable of hunting in trees when necessary. It is an opportunistic carnivore with a hunting pattern that can be diurnal, crepuscular, or nocturnal depending on human disturbance and prey availability. Its diet consists largely of small ungulates such as muntjacs and chevrotains, alongside rodents, reptiles, birds, and occasionally domestic livestock.

It has been listed as Vulnerable on the IUCN Red List since 2025, and is threatened by poaching and habitat destruction, since Southeast Asian forests are undergoing the world's fastest regional deforestation as well as poaching for the illegal wildlife trade, where its pelt and bones are often sold as substitutes for tiger parts in traditional medicine.

== Taxonomy ==
Felis temminckii was the scientific name used in 1827 by Nicholas Aylward Vigors and Thomas Horsfield who described a reddish brown cat skin from Sumatra. Felis moormensis proposed by Brian Houghton Hodgson in 1831 was a young male cat caught alive by Moormi hunters in Nepal. Felis tristis proposed by Alphonse Milne-Edwards in 1872 was a spotted Asian golden cat from China. It was subordinated to the genus Catopuma proposed by Nikolai Severtzov in 1853.

Although briefly classified under the genus Pardofelis in 2007, a taxonomic revision determined that this species should be retained in the genus Catopuma. This decision was based on morphological analysis showing that its skull structure, as well as the characteristics of its legs and tail, differ from other species within the genus Pardofelis.

Two subspecies have been recognised as valid since 2017:

- C. t. temminckii occurs in Sumatra and the Malay Peninsula
- C. t. moormensis occurs from Nepal eastwards to Southeast Asia

This recognition was based on molecular genetic analysis that identified Kra Isthmus as the geographic barrier separating them.

=== Phylogeny ===
Phylogenetic analysis of the nuclear DNA in tissue samples from all Felidae species revealed that the evolutionary radiation of the Felidae began in Asia in the Miocene around 14.45 to 8.38 million years ago. Analysis of mitochondrial DNA of all Felidae species indicates a radiation at around 16.76 to 6.46 million years ago. The Asian golden cat forms an evolutionary lineage together with the bay cat (C. badia) and the marbled cat (Pardofelis marmorata), which diverged from a common ancestor between 8.42 to 4.27 million years ago, based on analysis of their nuclear DNA. All these species are grouped within the bay cat lineage.

Analysis of their mitochondrial DNA indicates a genetic divergence from their common ancestor between 8.47 to 0.41 million years ago. Both models agree that the marbled cat is the first species of this lineage that diverged, while the Asian golden cat and the bay cat diverged from each other about 6.42 to 0.03 million years ago

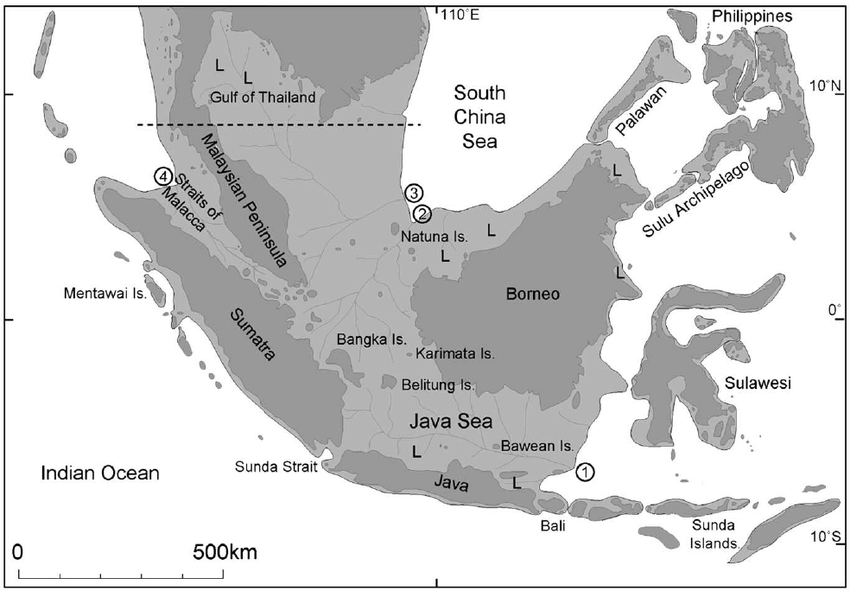
Sundaland during the Last Glacial Maximum

The divergence between the Asian golden cat and the bay cat is estimated to have occurred during the late Pliocene, approximately 3.16 million years ago, which is more recent than previous estimates. This process was driven by rising sea levels that submerged the Kra Isthmus, geographically dividing mainland Southeast Asia from the Sunda Shelf and diverging the two species.

The southern population located on the Sunda Shelf evolved into the bay cat, becoming highly dependent on tropical rainforest refugia that shrank due to climate change during the Last Glacial Maximum. In contrast, the northern population in mainland Southeast Asia evolved into the more adaptable Asian golden cat, which subsequently expanded southward to the Sunda Shelf such as Sumatra and the Malay Peninsula by utilizing land bridges available during the Pleistocene glacial periods. The difference in their coat colors highlights this evolutionary split. While the bay cat developed a more neutral camouflage adapted to life in a rainforest ecosystem, the Asian golden cat evolved a brighter and more varied coat to match its highly diverse range of environments.

Genetic analysis reveals very low nucleotide diversity across Asian golden cat populations. This lack of genetic variation suggests that the Asian golden cat experienced a severe population bottleneck, likely triggered by the Youngest Toba eruption approximately 74,000 years ago, which decimated vast tracts of tropical forest habitat across Southeast Asia, effectively forcing surviving populations into an ecological refugium in South China and Indochina. Following this near-extinction event, the Asian golden cat underwent continuous population expansion gradually repopulating regions outside of Indochina. While mainland populations remained highly polymorphic, displaying a wide variety of coat colors and patterns, the newly established populations south of the Kra Isthmus are predominantly reddish.

The following cladogram shows the phylogenetic relationships of the Asian golden cat:

- Felidae
  - Felinae
    - - - - - - Asian golden cat
              - Bay cat
            - Marbled cat
        - other Felinae lineages
  - Pantherinae

== Description ==
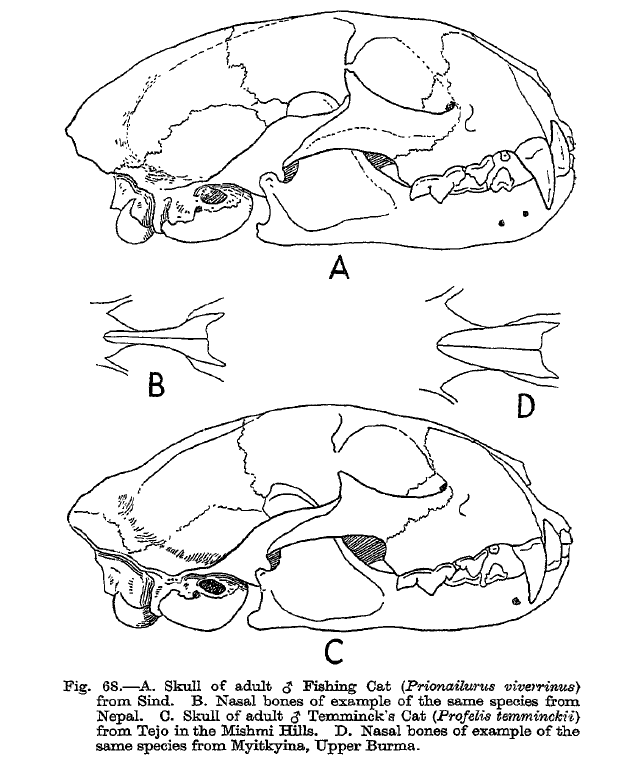
Illustration of skulls of Asian golden cat (bottom) and fishing cat (top)

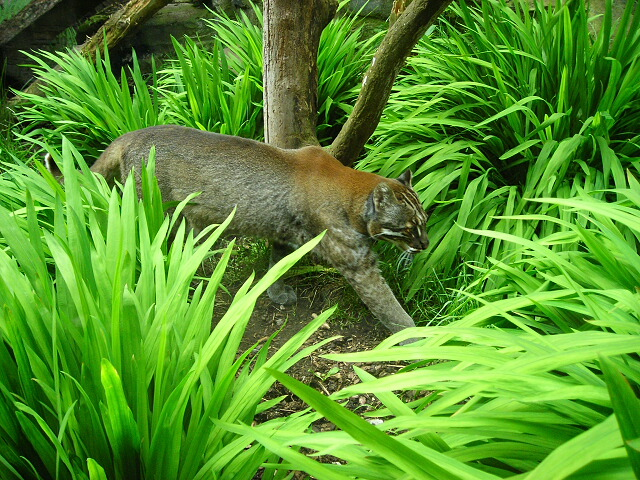
A gray morph at Edinburgh Zoo

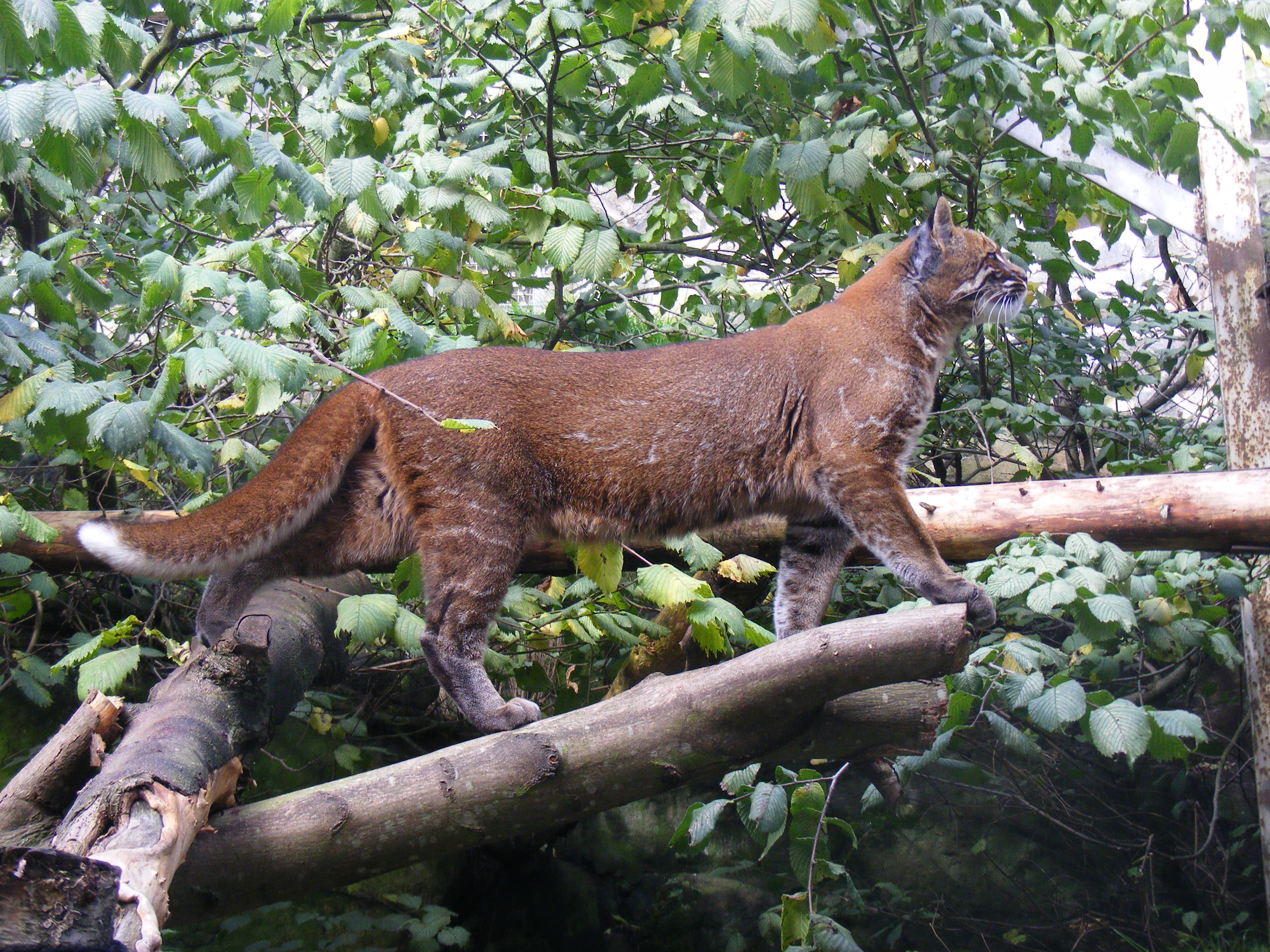
A red morph Asian golden cat at Edinburgh Zoo

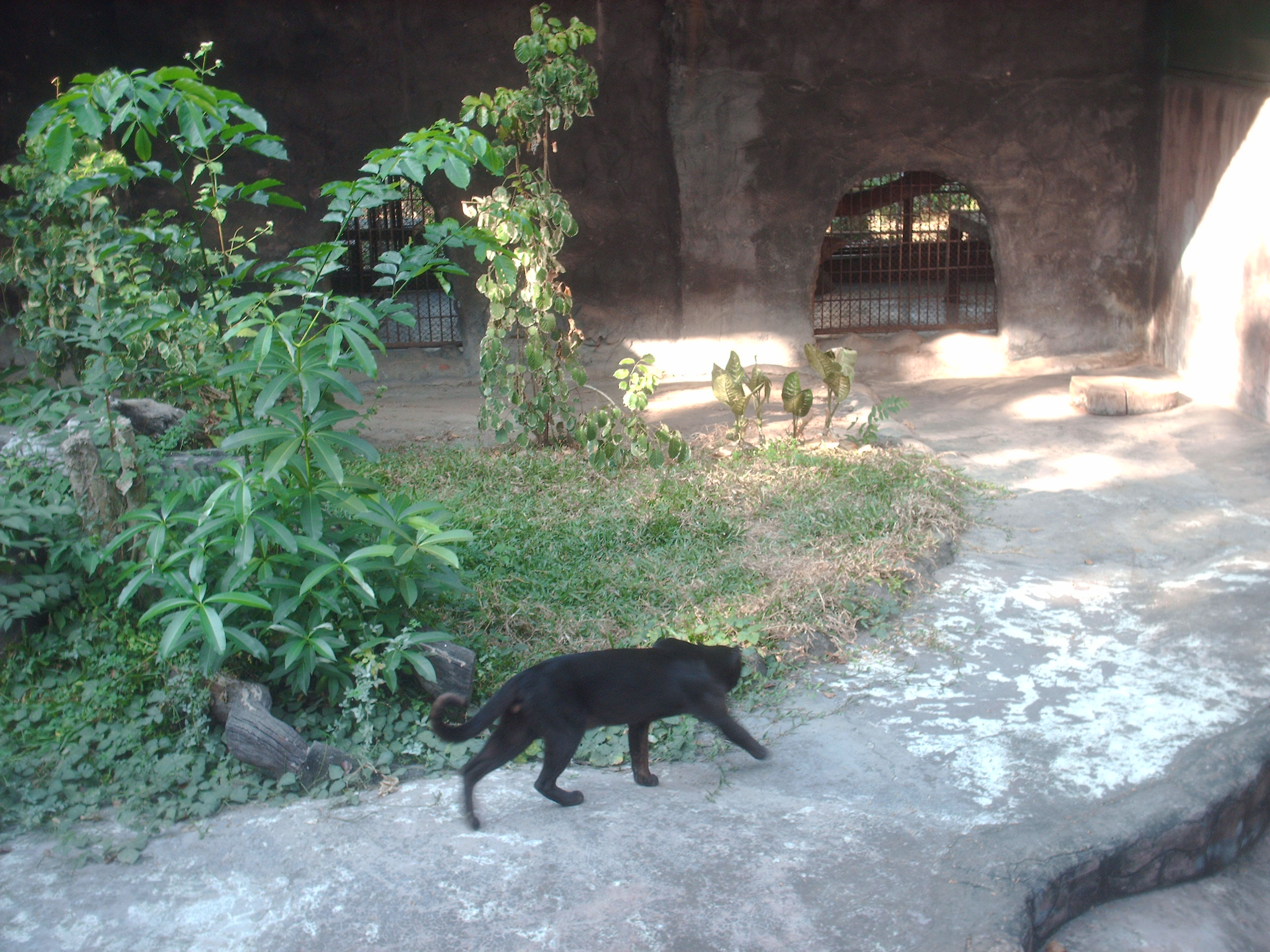
Melanistic form in Lao Zoo

The Asian golden cat is a medium-sized cat with a head-to-body length of 66–105 cm (26–41 in), with a 40–57 cm (16–22 in) long tail, and is 56 cm (22 in) tall at the shoulder. Its weight ranges from 9 to 16 kg (20 to 35 lb), which is about two or three times that of a domestic cat (Felis catus). The size of the tail is around one third and half of the body size. It exhibits sexual dimorphism, with females being smaller than males. It has 28 teeth.

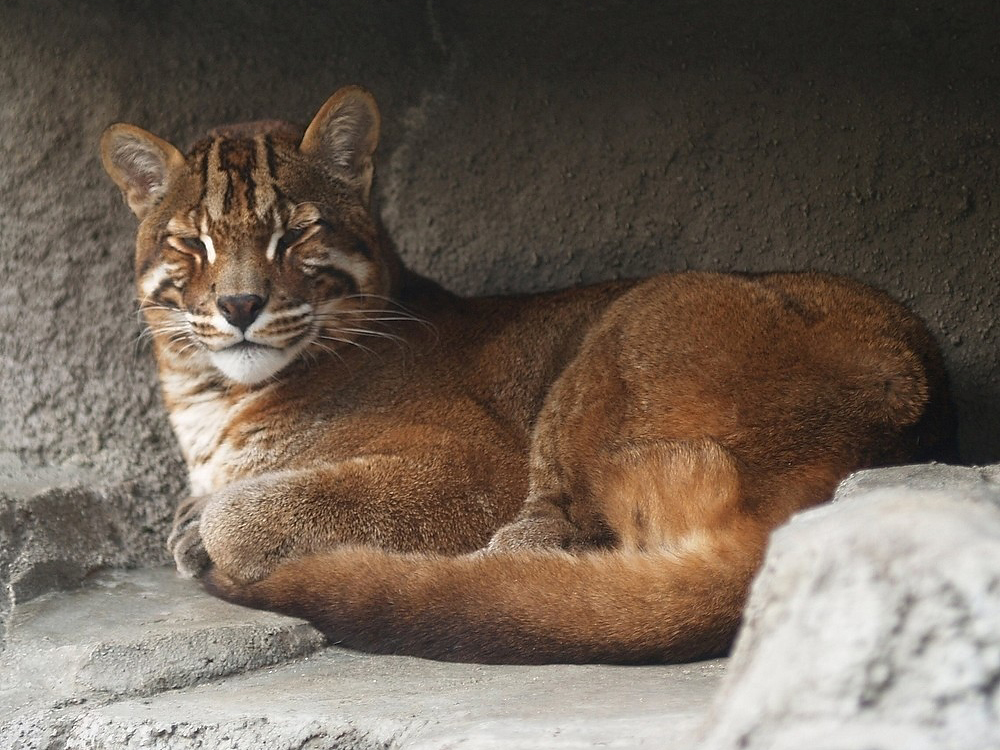
Facial markings of the Asian golden cat

The Asian golden cat has facial markings featuring white stripes edged in dark brown or black that stretch from the nose across the cheeks, highlight the inner corners of the eyes, and cross the top of its head. It has rounded ears with black backs and a distinct gray spot. Its chest, abdomen, and inner upper legs are pale white with light speckling, while the lower limbs and tail tip darken to gray or black. Its tail is white underneath with the tip curled upward.

It is polymorphic in colour. These variations include the distinct morphs golden, cinnamon, brown, spotted, brown, reddish-brown, gray, and black.

== Distribution and habitat ==
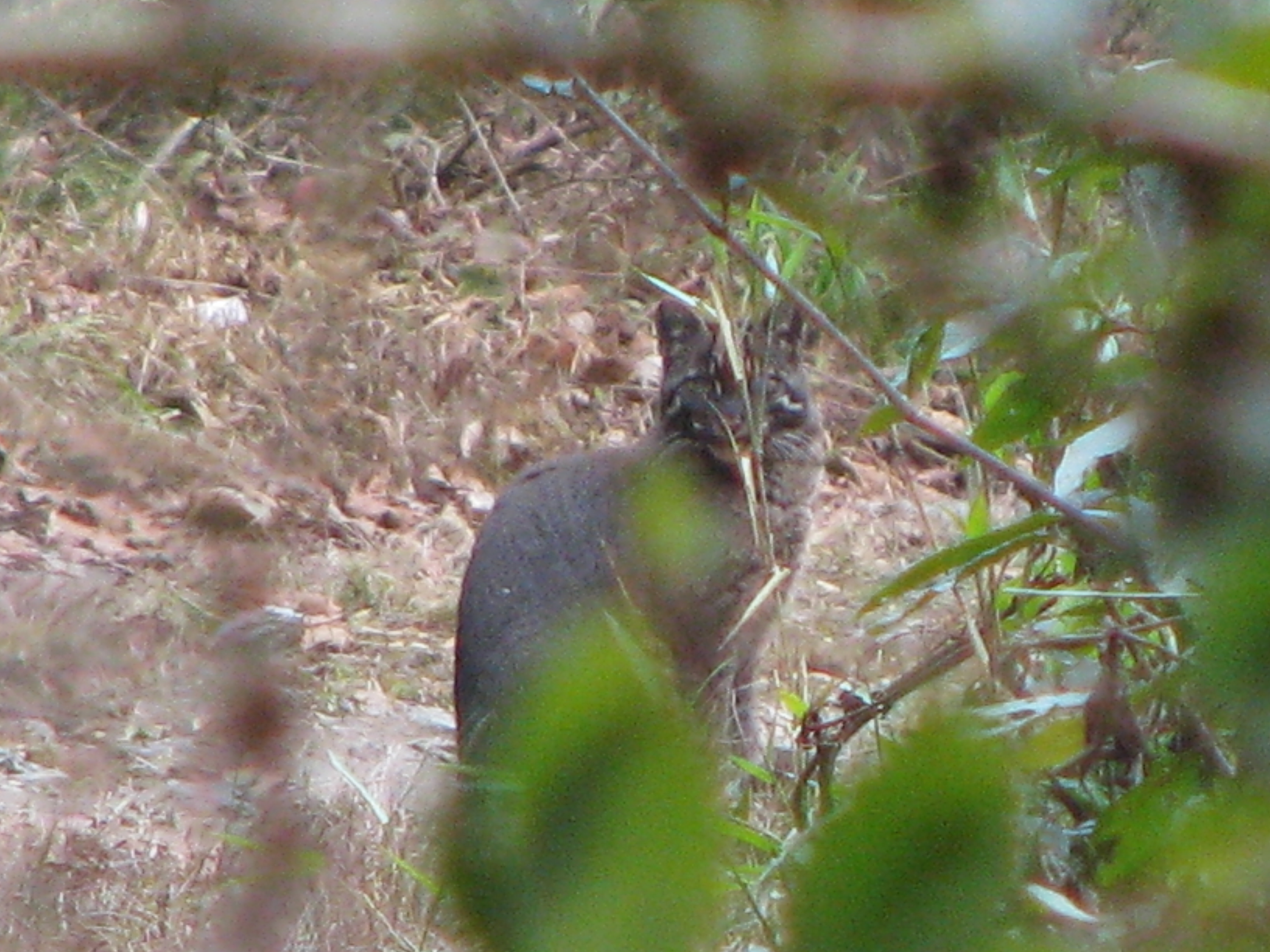
A grey morph of the Asian golden cat in Arunachal Pradesh, India

The Asian golden cat ranges from eastern Nepal, northeastern India and Bhutan to northeastern Bangladesh, to Myanmar, Thailand, Cambodia, Laos, Vietnam, southern China, Malaysia and Sumatra. It prefers forest habitats interspersed with rocky areas and inhabits dry deciduous, subtropical moist evergreen and tropical rainforests. It has also been recorded in grasslands, shrublands, plantations, secondary forests and montane ecosystems. It has been rarely encountered in forest fragments smaller than 100 km^{2} (39 sq mi) or near forest edges and currently around 80% of Southeast Asia’s fragmented forests are within 1 km of an edge.

The lowest elevation at which the Asian golden cat was recorded was 11 m (36 ft) in a coastal forest in Myanmar's Ayeyarwady Region, and the highest was 4,600 m (15,100 ft) in Bhutan.

Since a live individual was captured in 1831 in Nepal, the country has been recognized as the westernmost extent of its range. In 2025, it was recorded in Jajarkot District. In the mid-2000s, it was recorded in Gaurishankar Conservation Area, in the bufferzone of Makalu Barun National Park, in the Tinjure-Milke-Jaljale area, and in the Kangchenjunga landscape.

Five distinct morphs have been recorded in Bhutan, including golden, grey, melanistic, spotted and cinnamon, in Torsa Strict Nature Reserve, Wangchuck Centennial National Park, Phrumsengla National Park, and forests in Trashigang. Four of the morphs were recorded in Jigme Dorji National Park and Bumthang District. Spotted and gray morphs have also been recorded in Jigme Singye Wangchuck National Park. Only melanistic morph was recorded in Sakteng Wildlife Sanctuary and Sarpang Territorial Forest Division. It was also recorded in Jomotsangkha Wildlife Sanctuary and in Royal Manas National Park.

An Asian golden cat with large rosettes on its body was first described from a Chinese specimen in 1872. It was recorded in protected areas of the Qinling and Min Mountains between 2002 and 2009. The ocelot morph was recorded in Tangjiahe National Nature Reserve and Changqing National Nature Reserve. The golden morph is distributed across the Qinling and Hengduan Mountains, the Eastern Himalayas, southern Yunnan and Laohegou Nature Reserve. Gray morphs have also been recorded in the Eastern Himalayas, while the melanistic morph has been recorded in southern Yunnan. Additionally, cinnamon morphs were recorded during surveys in 2024 in southern Yunnan and the Eastern Himalayas. In Yarlung Tsangpo Grand Canyon and Gedang Township, all morph was recorded included golden, cinnamon, melanistic, spotted and gray morph.

The first record of the Asian golden cat in Bangladesh dates 1982 when a skin was collected in the Chittagong Hill Tracts. Later, the cinnamon morph was recorded in the West Bhanugach Reserve Forest in Moulvibazar alongside the melanistic morph. The Asian golden cat was also recorded in Patharia Hill Reserve and Satchari National Park.

In India, the Asian golden cat was sighted in Manas National Park in 2007. It has also been confirmed in Dampa Tiger Reserve, Neora Valley National Park, Namdapha National Park, Talley Valley Wildlife Sanctuary, Dehing Patkai Landscape, East Garo Hills district, South Garo Hills district, Jaintia Hills district and Singchung-Bugun Village Community Reserve, Khangchendzonga National Park, Pakke Tiger Reserve, Cinnamon, melanistic and brown morphs have been documented in Eaglenest Wildlife Sanctuary. Both brown and golden morph was recorded in Nongkhyllem Wildlife Sanctuary. Additionally, spotted, golden, and melanistic morphs were recorded in Buxa Tiger Reserve, Dibang Valley district, and Tuensang district.

In Myanmar, it was recorded in Hkakaborazi National Park and the surrounding area, in Royal Manas National Park, in the hill forests of Kayin State, Hukaung Valley Wildlife Sanctuary and Tanintharyi Nature Reserve. Skins were found in Hponkanrazi Wildlife Sanctuary, Hkakaborazi, Ali-aung, Tahaundam, Nam Tamai, Bumhpa Bum Wildlife Sanctuary and Htamanthi Wildlife Sanctuary.

In Thailand, the Asian golden cat was sighted in Khao Yai National Park and photographed in Kaeng Krachan Forest Complex, Hala-Bala Wildlife Sanctuary, Kui Buri National Park, Thap Lan National Park, Thung Yai Naresuan Wildlife Sanctuary, Huai Kha Khaeng Wildlife Sanctuary, Khao Ang Rue Nai Wildlife Sanctuary, Khao Luang National Park, Phu Khiao Wildlife Sanctuary and Khlong Nakha Wildlife Sanctuary.

In Cambodia, the Asian golden cat was recorded in Virachey National Park and in the Cardamom Mountains rain forests. In Vietnam, it was recorded in Pu Hoat Nature Reserve. In Laos, it inhabits Nam Et-Phou Louey National Park, Nam Phouy National Biodiversity Conservation Area, Xe Pian National Park Sangthong district, Nakai-Nam Theun National Park and Nam Kading National Protected Area.

In Malaysia, it was recorded in a state forest in Merapoh, Taman Negara, Endau-Rompin National Park and Jerangau Forest Reserve.

In Indonesia, reddish brown morphs were recorded in Sumatra in 1872. It has been recorded in Kerinci Seblat National Park, Gunung Leuser National Park, Batang Gadis National Park, Bukit Tigapuluh National Park and Bukit Barisan Selatan National Park. Melanistic morphs were recorded in Bukit Rimbang Bukit Baling Wildlife Sanctuary.

== Behaviour and ecology ==
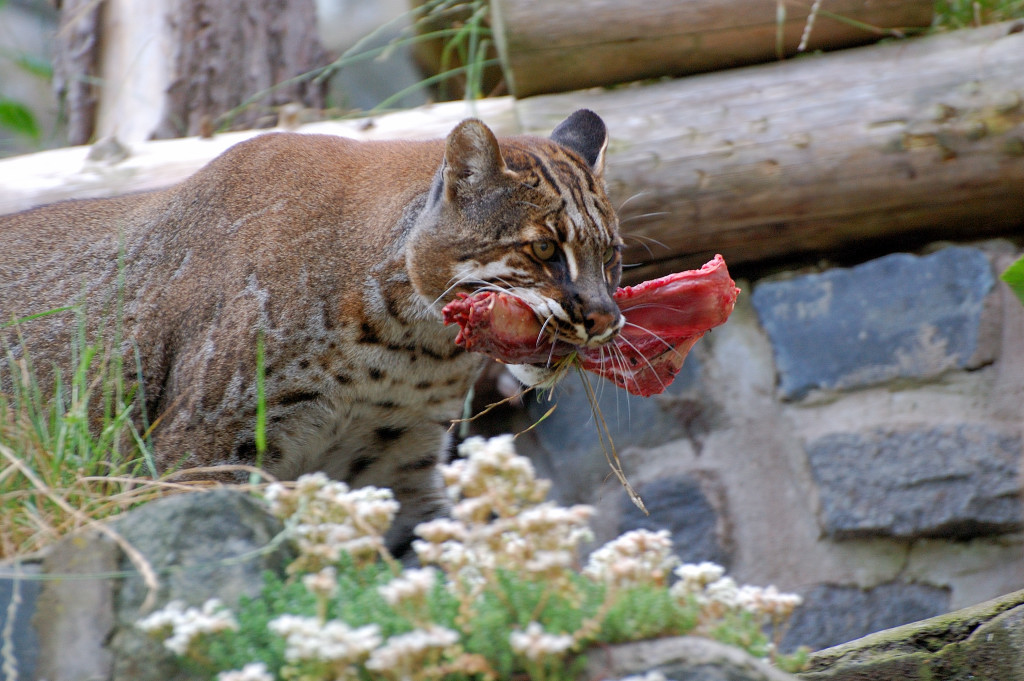
Asian golden cat with a piece of meat

The Asian golden cat is territorial and solitary. At first, it was identified as primarily nocturnal, but a field study on two radio-collared individuals revealed arrhythmic activity patterns dominated by crepuscular and diurnal activity peaks, with much less activity late at night. However, based on a 2026 camera trapping study, it has a flexible daily schedule, with crepuscular and nocturnal peaks, with average independent detection timestamp at shortly before midnight. This cathemeral activity is possibly influenced by its diverse choice of prey where this species preys on animals which are active in both day and night. During daytime, Asian golden cats were recorded with activity peaks around noon.

The male's territory was 47.7 km^{2} (18.4 sq mi) in size, and the female's territory was 32.6 km^{2} (12.6 sq mi). Both cats traveled between only 55 m (180 ft) to more than 9 km (5.6 mi) in a day with 53 % of the male's territory overlapping 78% territories of the female's territory. The highest activities were recorded in July and the lowest activities in March.

The Asian golden cat can climb trees when necessary. It is thought to hunt birds, hares, rodents, reptiles, and small ungulates such as muntjacs and young sambar deer. It reportedly preys on ghoral in the mountains of Sikkim.

Captive Asian golden cats kill small prey with the nape bite typical of cats. They also pluck birds larger than pigeons before beginning to feed. Their vocalizations include hissing, spitting, meowing, purring, growling, and gurgling. Other methods of communication observed in captive Asian golden cats include scent marking, urine spraying, raking trees and logs with claws, and rubbing of the head against various objects – much like a domestic cat.

=== Reproduction ===
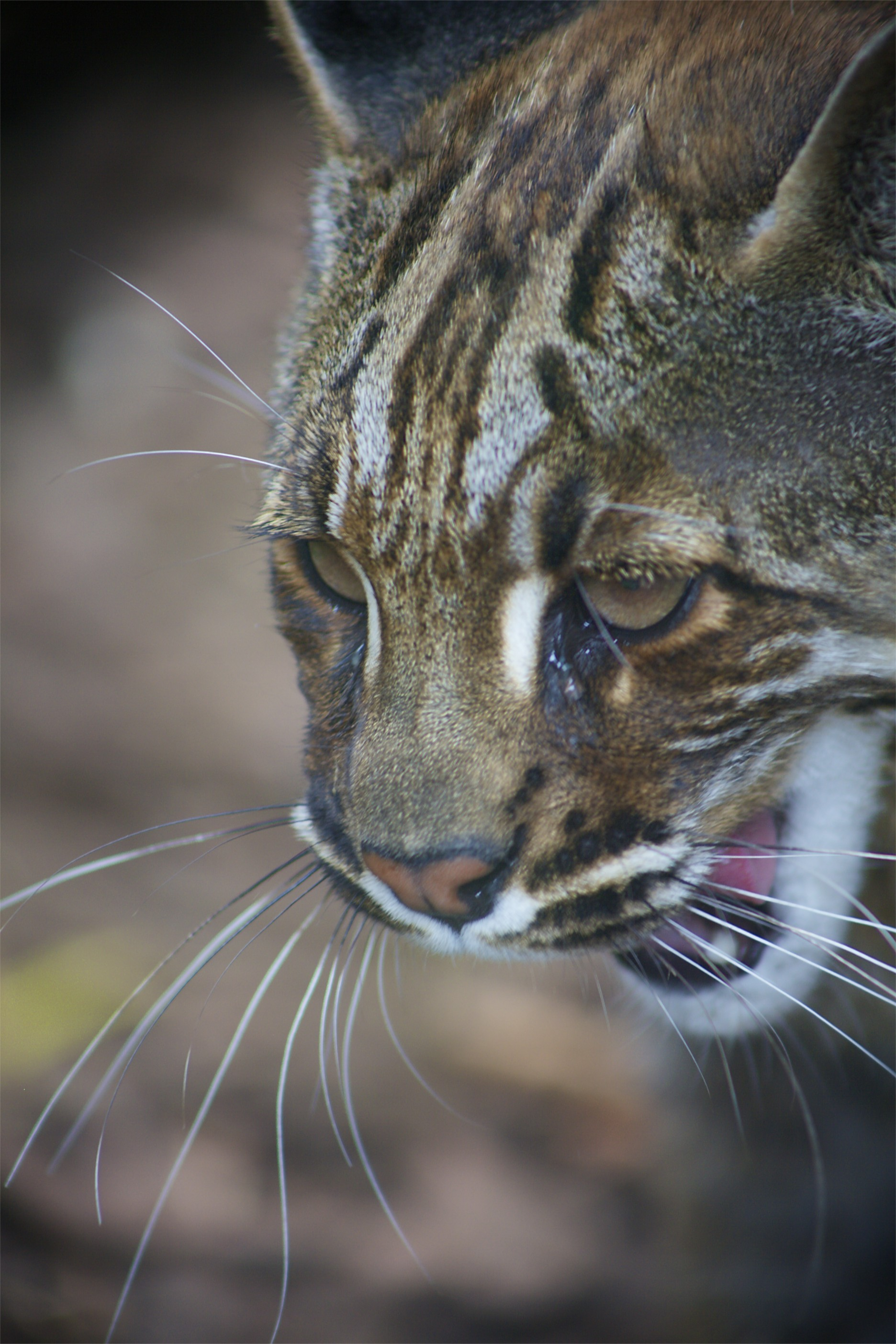

Captive Asian golden cats are sexually mature between 18 and 24 months, while males mature at 24 months, and females come into estrus every 39 days, at which time they leave markings and seek contact with the male by adopting receptive postures. Oestrus lasts for approximately six days. During copulation, the male seizes the skin of the neck of the female with his teeth, though he does not sustain the bite. The female gives birth after a gestation period of 78 to 80 days to a litter of one to three kittens in a sheltered place. The kittens weigh 220–250 g (7.8–8.8 oz) at birth, but triple in size over the first eight weeks of life. They are born with the adult coat pattern and open their eyes after six to 12 days. Usually, the male kills the litter, but some males help rearing and licking the young. In the wild, the Asian golden cat gives birth in a hollow ground or under the trees or rocks.

Captive Asian golden cats live for up to 20 years.

== Threats ==
The Asian golden cat was assessed on the IUCN Red List as Lower risk in 1996, as Vulnerable in 2002, as Near Threatened in 2008 and 2015; since 2025, it is again listed as Vulnerable, with a global population estimated at 7,000 mature individuals. It is threatened mainly by habitat destruction following deforestation. It prefers to live at higher elevations, but climate change is driving agricultural expansion into the highlands and making its habitat more fragmented.

In Pasaman Regency and Agam Regency, Asian golden cat have been reportedly trapped in human-made traps intended for other wild animals. Unintentional snaring around the protected area in Bhutan became one of the threat alongside a declining ungulate prey base across Southeast Asia Retaliatory killing using poison for preying on livestock is also a threat.

=== Illegal wildlife trade ===
In Southeast Asia and China, it is threatened by poaching for the illegal wildlife trade. This trade has the greatest potential to do maximum harm in minimal time. Asian golden cats are poached mainly for their fur. Other than that, their bones are used in traditional medicine and their meat is eaten as human's food. With the decline of tigers and leopards, the demand for their body parts has shifted to smaller felid species, including the Asian golden cat.

In Myanmar, 111 body parts from at least 110 individuals were observed in four designated between 1991 and 2006. Other than Kyaiktiyo Pagoda, three of the surveyed market consisting of Mong La, Tachileik and Three Pagodas Pass are situated on international borders with China and Thailand and their main buyers were assumed to be people outside the country. Although the Asian golden cat is completely protected under the country's national legislation, the effective implementation and enforcement of CITES is considered inadequate. Based on finding that was onserved between 2006 and 2014, there is a decline in the trade in Tachileik because of local law enforcement. However, there is an increase in the trade in Mong La. This situation happened because Mong La is ruled by armed groups.

== Conservation ==
The Asian golden cat is included in CITES Appendix I and fully protected over most of its range since 1 July 1975. In Bangladesh, it is protected under Wildlife (Conservation and Security) Act 2012 that prohibits to hunt and own it. In India, it is protected under Schedule I of the Wild Life (Protection) Act, 1972. It is categorized as Class I Protection in the list of key protected wild animals in China. Hunting is prohibited in India, Indonesia, Malaysia, Myanmar, Nepal, Thailand and Vietnam. Hunting is regulated in Laos. No information about protection status is available from Cambodia. In Bhutan, it is protected only within the boundaries of protected areas.The Office of Natural Resources and Environmental Policy and Planning of Thailand also listed the Asian golden cat as vulnerable.

In Nagaland's Peren district, an indigenous and community conserved area has been inaugurated for the conservation of the Asian Golden cat in May 2026.

=== In captivity ===
As of December 2008, there were 20 Asian golden cats in eight European zoos participating in the European Endangered Species Programme. The pair in the German Wuppertal Zoo successfully bred in 2007, and in July 2008, two siblings were born and mother-reared. In 2008, a female kitten was also born in the French Parc des Félins. The species is also kept in the Singapore Zoo.

== In culture ==
In China, the Asian golden cat is thought to be a kind of leopard and is known as "rock cat" or "yellow leopard". Different colour phases have different names; those with black fur are called "inky leopards", and those with spotted coats are called "sesame leopards".

In some regions of Thailand, the Asian golden cat is called seua fai (Thai: เสือไฟ, lit. 'fire tiger'). According to a regional legend, the burning of an Asian golden cat's fur drives tigers away. Eating the flesh is believed to have the same effect. The Karen people believe that carrying a single hair of the cat is sufficient. Many indigenous people believe the cat to be fierce, but in captivity it has been known to be docile and tranquil. In southern Thailand, it is called kang kude (Thai: คางคูด) and believed to be a fierce animal that can hurt or eat livestock and larger animals such as Asian elephants.
