= Tibetans in Burma =

Tibetan Burmese
Total population
- 200+

Regions with significant populations
- Tahaundam, Kachin State

Languages
- Tibetan, Burmese

Religion
- Buddhism

Related ethnic groups
- Tibetans

Tibetans in Burma are a relatively unknown and small Tibetan population outside of Tibet. They are concentrated primarily in the northernmost village in Myanmar (Burma), Tahaundam. As early into the twentieth century as 1932, Tibetans, along with Chinese traders, conducted raids into the northernmost regions of Burma, often displacing the Derung pygmies who resided there. As recently as 2003, Tibetan Khampa traders still crossed the border into Burma to conduct business.

In 2002-2003, P. Christiaan Klieger, anthropologist from the California Academy of Sciences, and photographer Dong Lin retraced their previous steps, and succeeded in making the first anthropological survey of the Hkakabo Razi region. On foot they reached Tahaundam, which is inhabited by about 200 Khampa Tibetans, including mountaineer Nyima Gyaltsen (see below).

== See also ==
- Tibetan diaspora
- Tibetan people
- Kham
- Ethnic groups in Myanmar
