= Nogmung =

Town in Kachin State, Myanmar

Nogmung နောင်မွန်းမြို့
- View of Nogmung

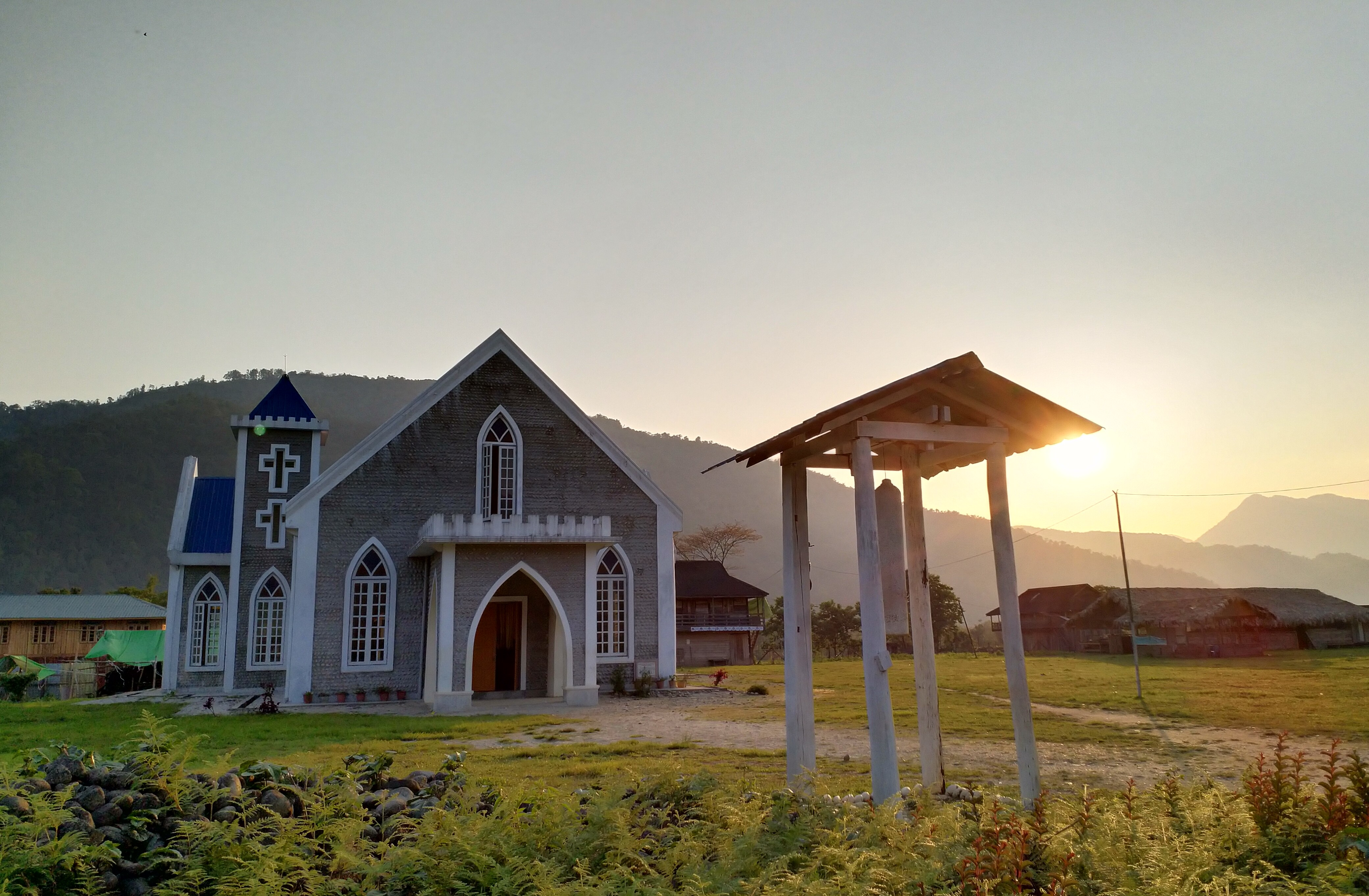
- Church in Nogmung

- Location in Myanmar
- Coordinates: 27°30′0″N 97°49′0″E
- Country: Myanmar
- Division: Kachin State
- District: Putao District
- Township: Nogmung Township

Population (2005)
  - Religions: Buddhism
- Time zone: UTC+6.30 (MST)

Nogmung (Burmese: နောင်မွန်းမြို့); sometimes Naung Mung or Naun Mong and combinations) is the northernmost town in Myanmar, located in Kachin State with about 1,000 inhabitants as of 2006. It is the last town encountered when hiking northwards to Hkakaborazi National Park and the highest peak of Myanmar, Mt. Hkakabo Razi. Nogmung is also the gateway for Tahaundam, the northernmost village of Myanmar. Nogmung is famous for its bird diversity, and many endemic species are postulated to exist there. The placename means "outside the country" (ၼွၵ်ႈမိူင်း) in Shan.

In 2005, the Naung Mung scimitar babbler (Jabouilleia naungmungensis) was described based on a specimen collected near Nogmung. The Smithsonian's National Zoo and the Hkakabo Razi National Park Authorities have surveyed the avifauna since 2001 in Putao, Nogmung, and northwards to Tahaundam.
