= Andy Tyson =

American mountaineer (1968–2015)

- Born: Andrew David Tyson; October 15, 1968; Mercersburg, Pennsylvania, US
- Died: April 10, 2015 (46 years old); Custer County, Idaho, US
- Education: Geology and physical education, 1991
- Alma mater: Wittenberg University
- Occupations: Mountaineer, alpine guide, renewable energy consultant and engineer
- Employer: Creative Energies
- Known for: First ascent of Gamlang Razi
- Spouse: Molly Loomis Tyson

Andrew David "Andy" Tyson (October 15, 1968 – April 10, 2015) was an American businessman and mountaineer. Tyson was known for his first ascents of Gamlang Razi and for climbing new routes on China's Genyen Massif. Over the course of Tyson's mountaineering career, he climbed some of the world's most notable peaks, including Everest, Cho Oyu, Nanda Devi, Denali, Aconcagua in Argentina; the Vinson Massif in Antarctica; and Mont Blanc in the Alps.

== Background ==
Tyson was born October 15, 1968, in Pennsylvania. He graduated from Mercersburg Academy and studied at Wittenberg University, graduating with a degree in Geology and physical education in 1991.

In 2001, he co-founded Creative Energies, a company focused on renewable energy.

=== Mountaineering ===
In 1992, Tyson attended an instructor's course at the National Outdoor Leadership School. The next year, he would become an instructor for the school, a role he would hold for the next decade. A mountaineering specialist, he would go on to teach climbers in Mynanmar and Nepal, and worked as a mountain guide for international mountaineering expeditions in Alaska and the Himalayas.

In 2003, he summitted Cho-Oyu. In 2005 he wrote Glacier Mountaineering with his wife Molly Loomis. The next year, the pair wrote Climbing Self Rescue. In 2008, he summitted Mount Vinson in Antarctica.

In 2012, Tyson was part of an expedition team alongside Dave Anderson, his wife Molly Loomis, and Canadian Sarah Huenikennd to China's Genyen Massif. Also known as Mount Gamlang, it was last surveyed by the British Empire in 1925. While climbing in the region, Tyson and Loomis made a first ascent on an unnamed 18,500-foot peak on the massif they named Phurpa.

In 2013, Tyson achieved the first known ascent of the mountain Gamlang Razi on 7 September 2013 with Eric Daft, Mark Fisher, Chris Nance, Molly Loomis Tyson, and Pyae Phyo Aung. The group measured the peak to be 5,870 meters (19,259 ft), which would make it higher than Hkakabo Razi, believed at that time to be the highest peak in Myanmar and Southeast Asia.

In 2014, Tyson made a trip to Mount Everest to climb for a feature for the Discovery Channel. While there, he survived the 2014 Mount Everest avalanche. While at Everest, he took a number of photos of the avalanche's aftermath, which were later featured in National Geographic magazine.

=== Fatal accident ===
In 2015, Tyson died with several others from his company Creative Energies in a plane crash at Diamond D ranch in Idaho. The Cessna T210M crashed in Custer County, Idaho. In the crash investigation it was noted that wind currents in mountain areas can push small planes around.

After Tyson's death, Energy Conservation Works developed the Andy Tyson Leadership Award in Sustainability in his memory.

== See also ==
- List of Mount Everest guides
