= Chestnut-necklaced partridge =

Conservation status
- Vulnerable (IUCN 3.1)

Scientific classification
- Kingdom: Animalia
- Phylum: Chordata
- Class: Aves
- Order: Galliformes
- Family: Phasianidae
- Genus: Tropicoperdix
- Species: T. charltonii

Binomial name
- Tropicoperdix charltonii (Eyton, 1845)

Species of bird

The chestnut-necklaced partridge (Tropicoperdix charltonii) is a species of bird in the family Phasianidae. It is found in forests in the Malay Peninsula and Sumatra. It is threatened by habitat loss and trapping. The International Union for Conservation of Nature (IUCN) has assessed it as vulnerable.

== Taxonomy ==
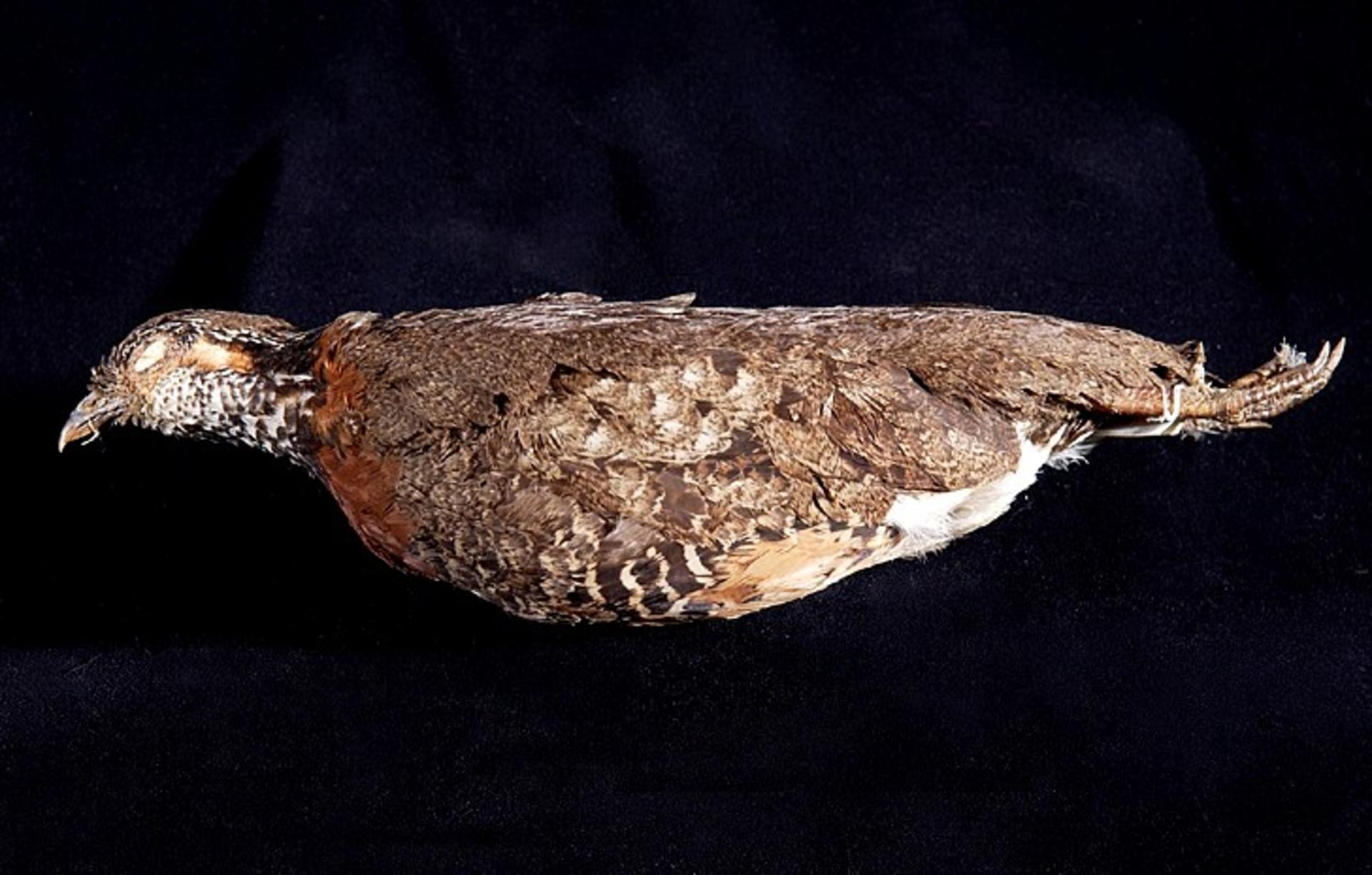
Specimen at Naturalis Biodiversity Center

This species was described by Thomas Campbell Eyton as Perdix Charltonii in 1845. The IOC World Bird List recognises the subspecies T. c. charltonii found in the Malay Peninsula, T. c. atjenensis in Sumatra. Some authorities have considered the green-legged partridge (A. chloropus) to be conspecific with this species. The Sabah partridge (T. graydoni) was also previously considered conspecific.

== Description ==
The chestnut-necklaced partridge is 26–32 cm (10–13 in) long. The male weighs about 290 g (10 oz) and the female weighs about 250 g (8.8 oz). The crown and nape are brown, with dark speckles. The whitish supercilium, throat and neck have brown streaks. The upper breast is chestnut, with a blackish collar above it. The lower breast is brown, and the belly and flanks are buff. There are dark scales on the lower breast and flanks. The upperparts are brown, finely marked blackish and buff. The beak is greenish yellow, and the legs are yellow. The female bird is smaller and a little duller than the male. The subspecies atjenensis has brighter plumage, and graydoni has greenish-yellow legs.

== Distribution and habitat ==
This partridge is found in the Thai-Malay Peninsula, Aceh, and South Sumatra. Its habitat is lowland evergreen forest and secondary forest.

== Behaviour ==
This partridge probably forages in small groups, eating seeds, berries and termites. Its breeding has not been recorded. Its call is loud, steady couplets and triplets of whistles, and pairs often duet.

== Status ==
The number of mature individuals is probably less than 10,000 and may be less than 2500. On Sumatra, the population is expected to be very small, if not extinct. It is suspected to be declining because deforestation, logging and forest fires have destroyed much habitat and it is trapped and traded. The IUCN has assessed it as a vulnerable species.
