= Jabouille =

Jabouille is a French surname. Notable people with the surname include:

- Jean-Pierre Jabouille (1942–2023), French racing driver
- Pierre Jabouille (1875–1947), French administrator and ornithologist
