= The Jade World from Manaw Land =

2019 Myanmar film directed by JZ Daung Lwam

- မနောမြေမှ ကျောက်စိမ်းကမ္ဘာ
- Directed by: JZ Daung Lwam
- Written by: JZ Daung Lwam
- Produced by: Moon Myanmar Media
- Starring: Kachin ethnic actors
- Release date: February 15, 2019 (Myanmar)
- Country: Myanmar
- Language: Kachin

The Jade World from Manaw Land (မနောမြေမှ ကျောက်စိမ်းကမ္ဘာ) is a 2019 Myanmar film directed by JZ Daung Lwam and produced by Moon Myanmar Media. The film was filmed primarily in the Kachin language and received the Academy Special Award at the 2016 Myanmar Motion Picture Academy Awards.

The film depicts the harsh realities of jade miners' lives in the Hpakant region of Kachin State. It explores the struggles of local communities amidst the backdrop of the region's natural beauty, including the snow-capped mountains of northern Myanmar. The dialogue is in the Kachin language, with Burmese subtitles provided for wider distribution.

== Production and release ==
Directed and written by Kachin filmmaker JZ Daung Lwam, the production involved extensive filming in remote areas, including Hpakant and the foothills of Hkakabo Razi. It features a cast of Kachin ethnic artists.

The film was released across Myanmar on 15 February 2019.

== Awards ==
At the 2016 Myanmar Motion Picture Academy Awards ceremony (held in 2017), the film was honored with the Academy Special Award for its portrayal of ethnic culture and high production values despite challenging conditions.
