= Vietnam partridge =

Scientific classification
- Domain: Eukaryota
- Kingdom: Animalia
- Phylum: Chordata
- Class: Aves
- Order: Galliformes
- Family: Phasianidae
- Genus: Tropicoperdix
- Species: T. chloropus
- Subspecies: T. c. merlini

Trinomial name
- Tropicoperdix chloropus merlini Delacour & Jabouille, 1924

Subspecies of bird

The Vietnam partridge, Annam partridge, or Annam hill partridge, Tropicoperdix chloropus merlini, is now usually considered a subspecies of the green-legged partridge in the family Phasianidae of birds.

It is endemic to Vietnam in the dense moist lowland forests of central Annam.

== Description ==
This species is 29 cm long, with the female slightly smaller than the male. The male weighs 290 grams and the female 250 grams.

The Vietnam partridge has a finely barred brown back. Its head is paler except for a brown crown and ear coverts. It has a scaly upper breast, lacking the chestnut of its relatives, and the rest of the underparts are buff with dark arrow markings on the flanks. The sexes have similar plumage.

The call is a series of clear whistles.

== Behaviour and status ==
This little-known and shy species feeds in small flocks on seeds, berries and termites. It is threatened by habitat loss through deforestation and is restricted to two small areas of Annam.
