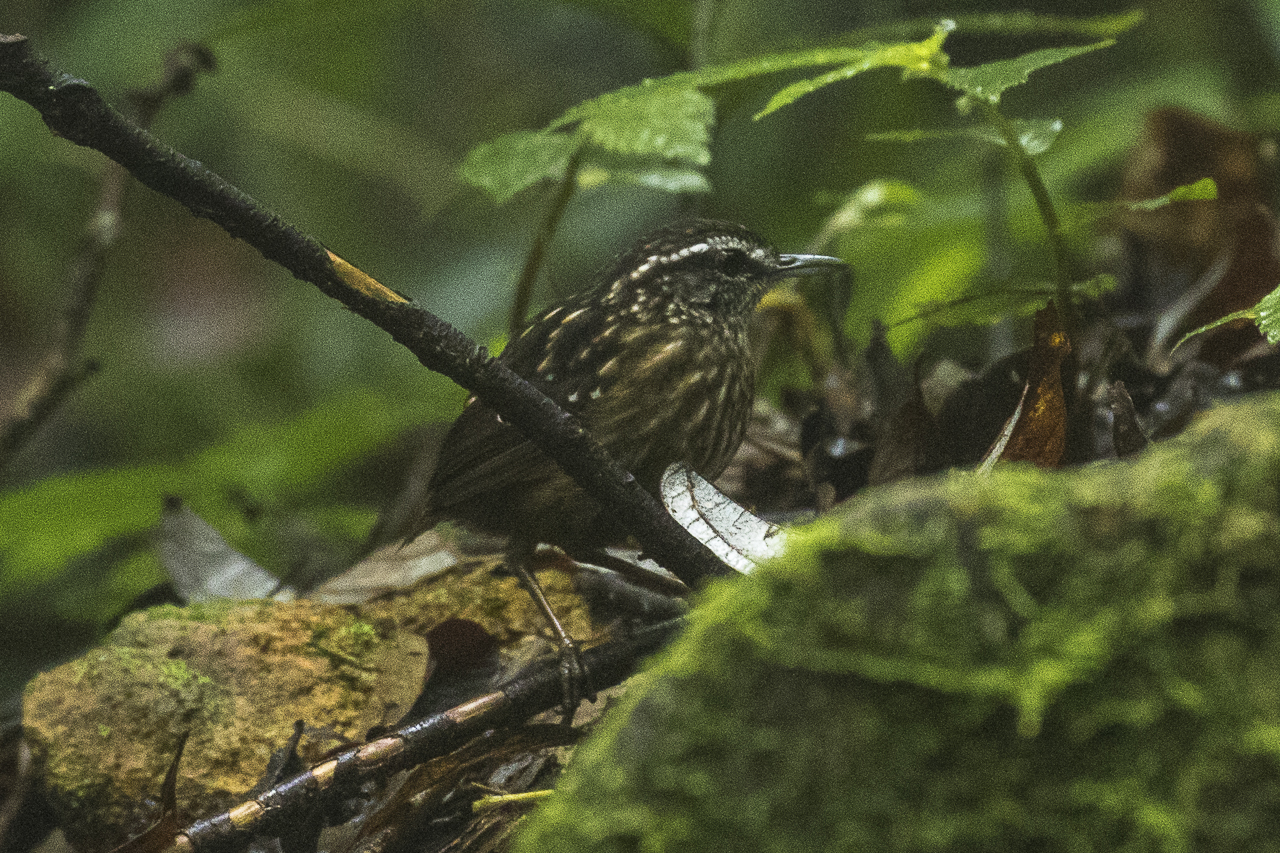

Conservation status
- Least Concern (IUCN 3.1)

Scientific classification
- Kingdom: Animalia
- Phylum: Chordata
- Class: Aves
- Order: Passeriformes
- Family: Pellorneidae
- Genus: Napothera
- Species: N. epilepidota

Binomial name
- Napothera epilepidota (Temminck, 1828)

Synonyms
- Turdinulus roberti Hume and Davidson, 1879

= Eyebrowed wren-babbler =

Species of bird

The eyebrowed wren-babbler (Napothera epilepidota) is a species of bird in the family Pellorneidae. Its range extends from the eastern Himalayas throughout Southeast Asia.

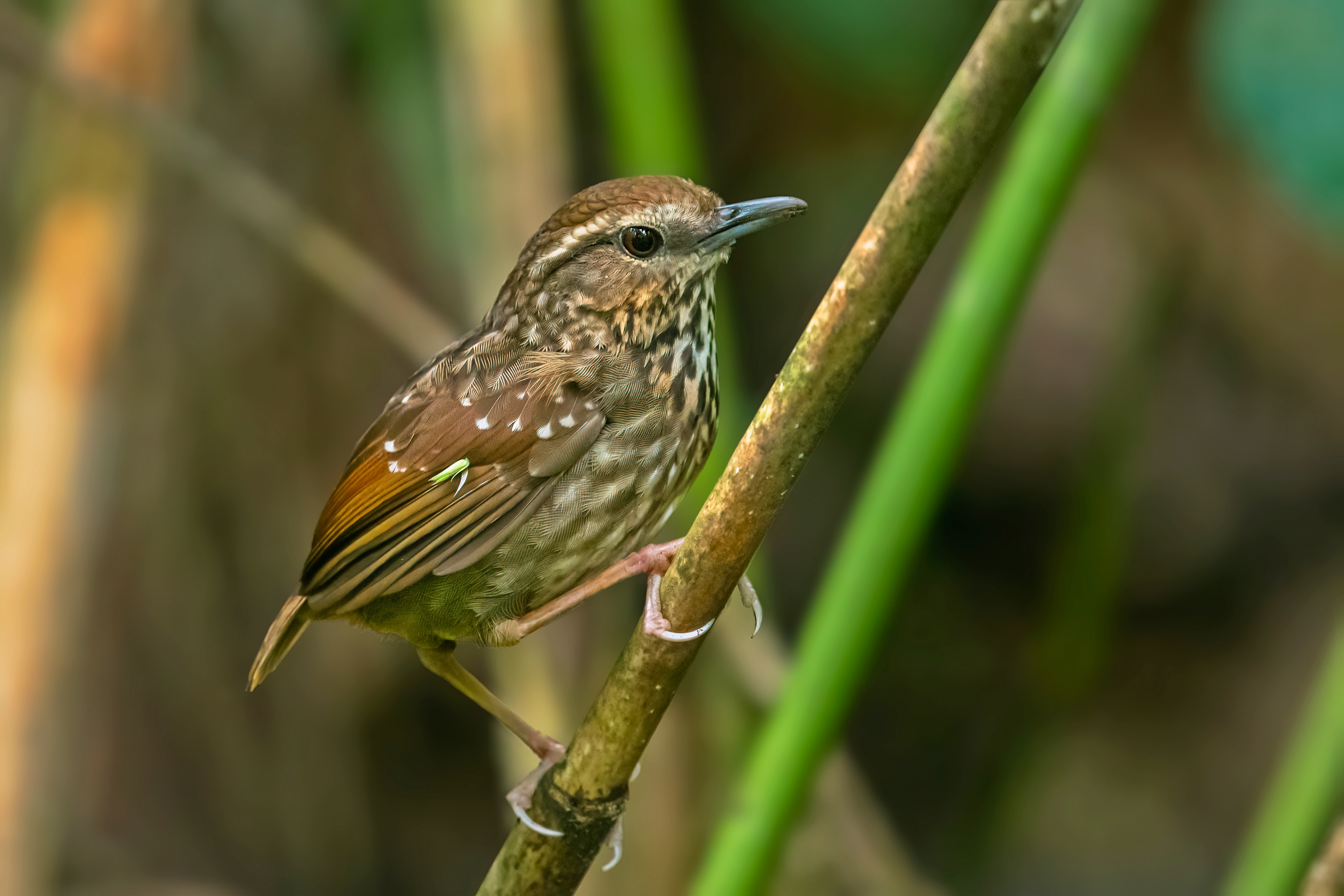
A rare lighter brown plumage, Namdapha National Park, Arunachal Pradesh, India.

Its natural habitats are subtropical or tropical moist lowland forest and subtropical or tropical moist montane forest.
