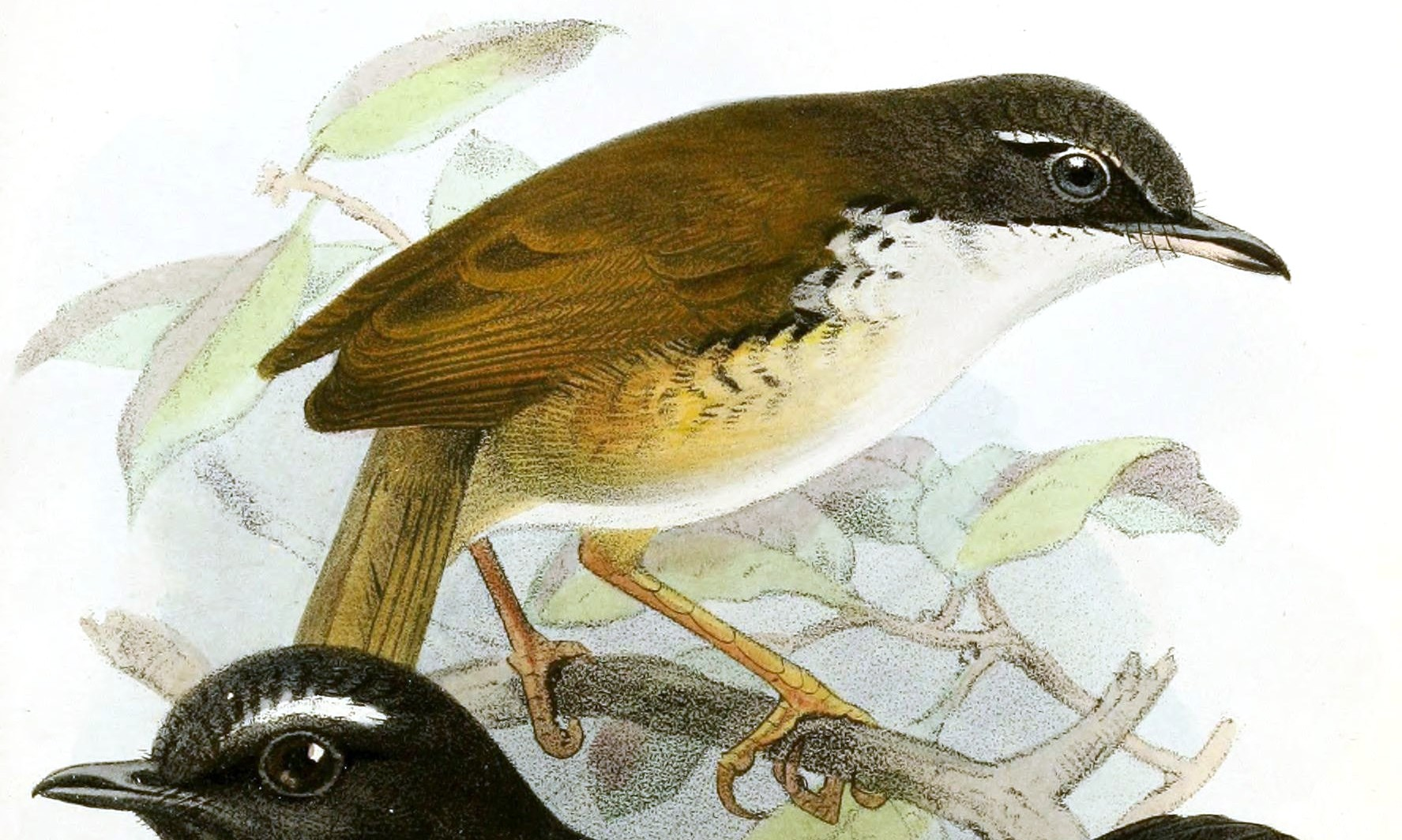

Conservation status
- Endangered (IUCN 3.1)

Scientific classification
- Kingdom: Animalia
- Phylum: Chordata
- Class: Aves
- Order: Passeriformes
- Family: Pellorneidae
- Genus: Napothera
- Species: N. pasquieri

Binomial name
- Napothera pasquieri (Delacour & Jabouille, 1930)

Synonyms
- Rimator pasquieri

= White-throated wren-babbler =

Species of bird

The white-throated wren-babbler (Napothera pasquieri) is a species of bird in the family Pellorneidae.

It is endemic to northwestern Vietnam (Fansipan mountains).

Its natural habitat is subtropical or tropical moist montane forest.
