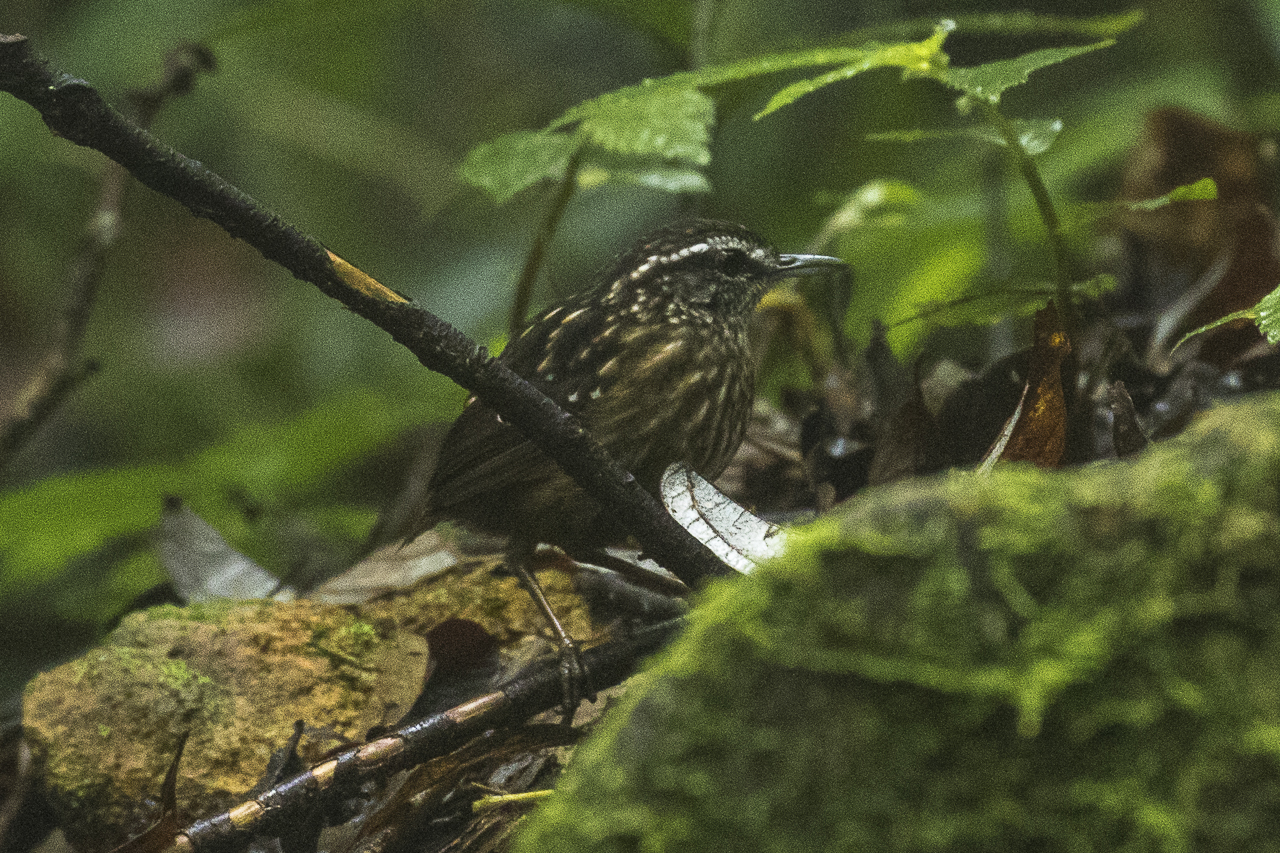
- Eyebrowed wren-babbler (Napothera epilepidota)

Scientific classification
- Kingdom: Animalia
- Phylum: Chordata
- Class: Aves
- Order: Passeriformes
- Family: Pellorneidae
- Genus: Napothera; G.R. Gray, 1842

Type species
- Myiothera epilepidota Temminck, 1828

Synonyms
- Rimator Blyth, 1847; Jabouilleia Delacour, 1927

= Napothera =

Genus of birds

Napothera is a genus of birds in the family Pellorneidae. Some of its species were formerly placed in the genera Rimator and Jabouilleia.

== Species ==
The genus contains the following species:

Image	Common Name	Scientific name	Distribution
	Eyebrowed wren-babbler	Napothera epilepidota	Bhutan, China, India, Indonesia, Laos, Malaysia, Myanmar, Thailand, and Vietnam.
	Long-billed wren-babbler	Napothera malacoptila, (formerly Rimator malacoptilus)	Eastern Himalayas.
	Sumatran wren-babbler	Napothera albostriata, (formerly Rimator albostriatus)	western Sumatra.
	White-throated wren-babbler	Napothera pasquieri, (formerly Rimator pasquieri)	northwestern Vietnam.
	Short-tailed scimitar babbler	Napothera danjoui, (formerly Rimator danjoui or Jabouilleia danjoui)	Laos and Vietnam.
	Naung Mung scimitar babbler	Napothera naungmungensis, (formerly Rimator naungmungensis or Jabouilleia naungmungensis)	Myanmar.
