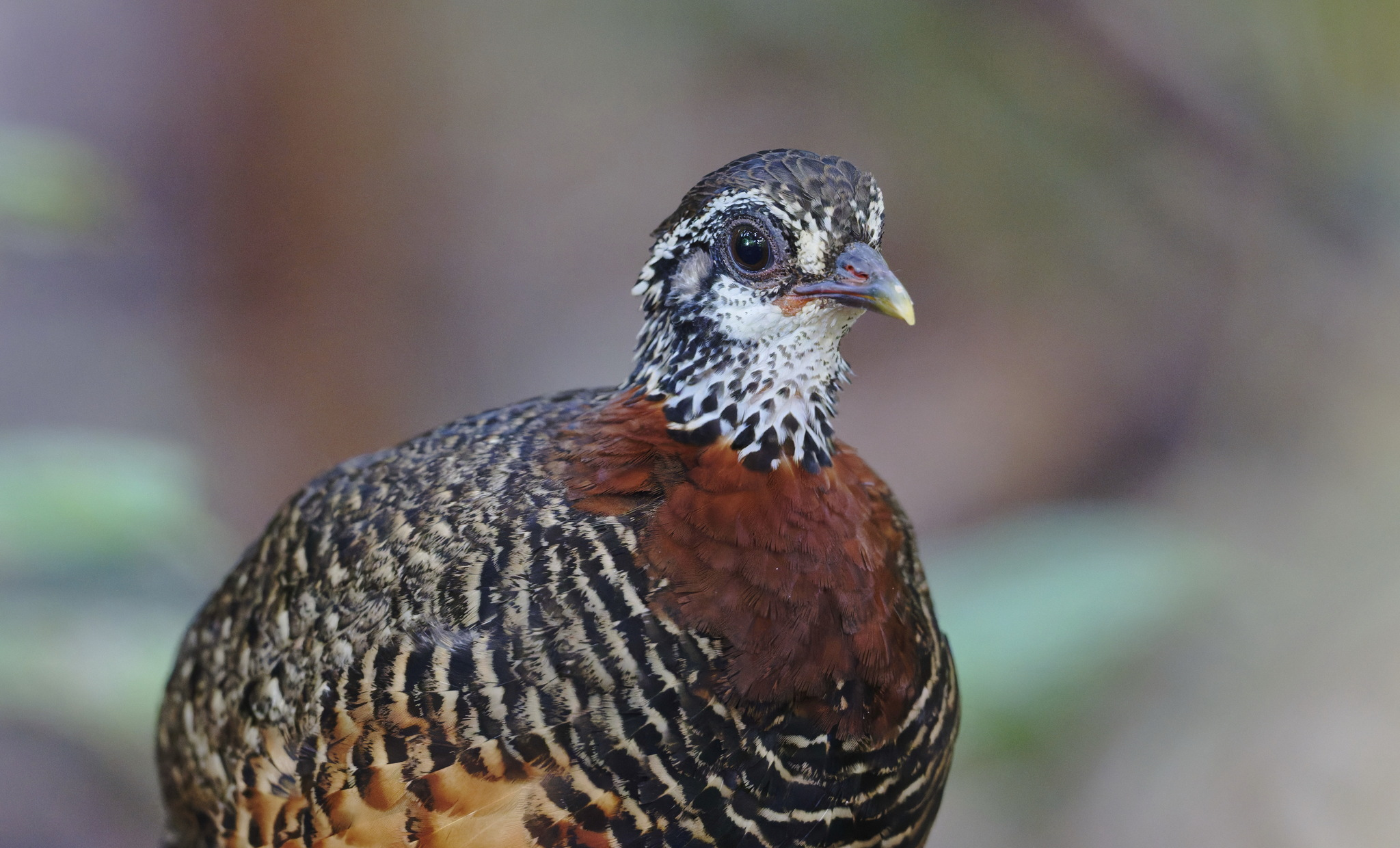

Conservation status
- Near Threatened (IUCN 3.1)

Scientific classification
- Kingdom: Animalia
- Phylum: Chordata
- Class: Aves
- Order: Galliformes
- Family: Phasianidae
- Genus: Tropicoperdix
- Species: T. graydoni

Binomial name
- Tropicoperdix graydoni (Sharpe & Chubb, 1906)

= Sabah partridge =

Species of bird

The Sabah partridge (Tropicoperdix graydoni) is a bird species in the family Phasianidae. It is found in Borneo.

It was formerly considered conspecific with the chestnut-necklaced partridge (T. charltonii), but can be distinguished by the buff scaling on the belly and the lack of rufous on the head.
