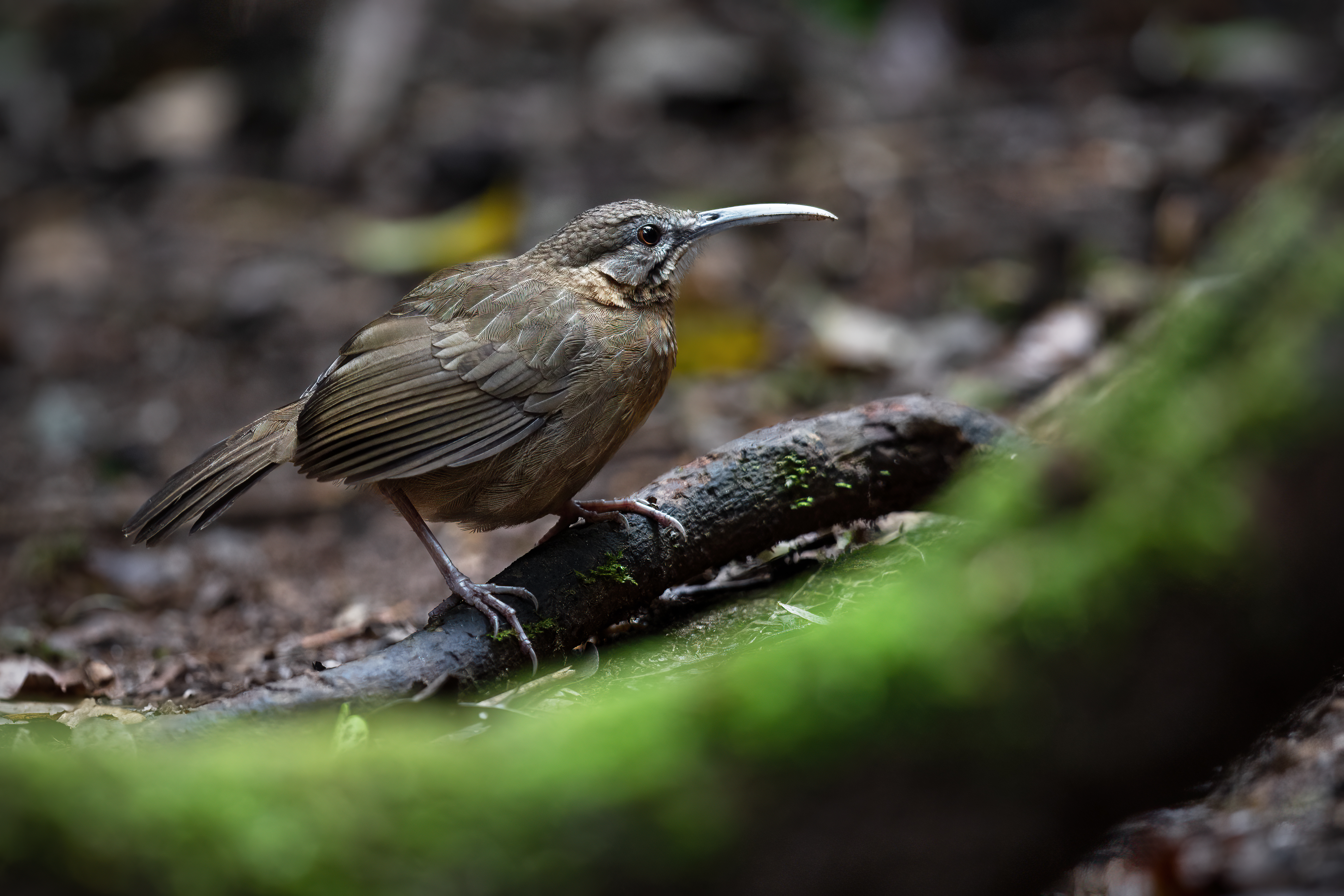

Conservation status
- Near Threatened (IUCN 3.1)

Scientific classification
- Kingdom: Animalia
- Phylum: Chordata
- Class: Aves
- Order: Passeriformes
- Family: Pellorneidae
- Genus: Napothera
- Species: N. danjoui

Binomial name
- Napothera danjoui (Robinson & Kloss, 1919)

Synonyms
- Rimator danjoui Jabouilleia danjoui

= Short-tailed scimitar babbler =

Species of bird

The short-tailed scimitar babbler or Indochinese wren-babbler, (Napothera danjoui) is a species of bird in the family Pellorneidae. It is found in Laos and Vietnam. Its natural habitats are subtropical or tropical moist lowland forest and subtropical or tropical moist montane forest. It is threatened by habitat loss. The Naung Mung scimitar babbler was formerly considered a distinct species, but is now considered conspecific.
