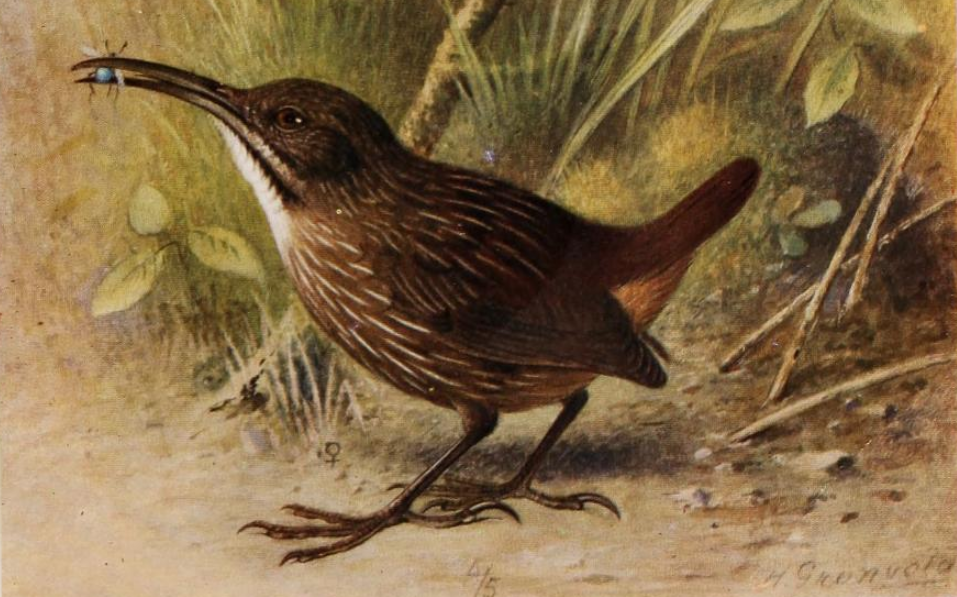

Conservation status
- Least Concern (IUCN 3.1)

Scientific classification
- Kingdom: Animalia
- Phylum: Chordata
- Class: Aves
- Order: Passeriformes
- Family: Pellorneidae
- Genus: Napothera
- Species: N. albostriata

Binomial name
- Napothera albostriata (Salvadori, 1879)

Synonyms
- Rimator albostriata

= Sumatran wren-babbler =

Species of bird

The Sumatran wren-babbler (Napothera albostriata) is a species of bird in the family Pellorneidae. It is endemic to western Sumatra. Its natural habitat is subtropical or tropical moist montane forest.
