= Naung Mung scimitar babbler =

Conservation status
- Vulnerable (IUCN 3.1)

Scientific classification
- Kingdom: Animalia
- Phylum: Chordata
- Class: Aves
- Order: Passeriformes
- Family: Pellorneidae
- Genus: Napothera
- Species: N. naungmungensis

Binomial name
- Napothera naungmungensis (Rappole, Renner, Shwe & Sweet, 2005)

Synonyms
- Napothera danjoui naungmungensis; Rimator naungmungensis; Rimator danjoui naungmungensis; Jabouilleia naungmungensis; Jabouilleia danjoui naungmungensis

Species of bird

The Naung Mung scimitar babbler (Napothera naungmungensis) is a bird in the family Pellorneidae, described as new to science in 2005. It is sometimes considered conspecific with the closely related short-tailed scimitar babbler.

The Naung Mung scimitar babbler is found in temperate rainforest on steep, sub-Himalayan hillsides. It was discovered in February 2004 in far northern Myanmar, and is named after the village of Naung Mung, the closest settlement to its discovery site.

It is believed to be fairly common within its range.
