= Gamlang Razi =

Mountain in Myanmar

- ဂမ်လန်ရာဇီ
- Location within Myanmar

Highest point
- Elevation: 5,870 m (19,260 ft)
- Prominence: 940 m (3,080 ft)
- Coordinates: 28°18′21.2″N 97°28′04.6″E

Geography
- Location: Kachin, Myanmar
- Parent range: Himalaya

Climbing
- First ascent: 7 September 2013 by Eric Daft, Mark Fisher, Chris Nance, Andy Tyson, Molly Loomis Tyson (all U.S.) and Pyae Phyo Aung (Myanmar)
- Easiest route: snow/ice climb

Gamlang Razi (Burmese: ဂမ်လန်ရာဇီ) is possibly Southeast Asia's highest mountain, located in the northern Myanmar state of Kachin. It is in Hkakaborazi National Park. The mountain lies on the border of Myanmar and Tibet, 15 km from the border tri-point with India. The 5881-m high Hkakabo Razi is located 6.6 km ENE from Gamlang Razi. It has year-round snow and glaciers. Mt. Gamlang Razi rock type is granite, according to the Department of Geological Survey of Myanmar.

== Climbing history ==
Andy Tyson (1968–2015) led the first ascent in 2013. The team consisted of five American climbers as well as two Burmese climbers from the Technical Climbing Club of Myanmar (TCCM). The expedition was mainly sponsored by the Htoo Foundation. The path to the base camp passes through several rainforests and crosses a number of streams. In favorable weather, it typically takes about two weeks to reach the base camp.

== Possibly the highest peak in Southeast Asia ==
Gamlang Razi has been measured at 5,870 ±2 m (19,259 ft). It makes the highest mountain in Southeast Asia whose height has been measured exactly by GPS. Hkakabo Razi has not yet been measured via GPS. However, Hkakabo Razi may still be the highest peak according to a recent expedition to that peak. Though the expedition team reached only 5742 m (18,840 ft), they estimated that Hkakabo Razi's summit to be another 240 m (800 ft) higher.

== See also ==
- List of mountains in Burma
- List of Southeast Asian mountains
