= Tahaundam =

- Location in Burma
- Coordinates: 28°10′9″N 97°40′42″E
- Country: Burma
- Division: Kachin State
- District: Putao District
- Township: Nogmung Township
- Elevation: 1,200 m (3,900 ft)
- Time zone: UTC+6.30 (MST)

Tahaundam (also spelt as Dahangdan) is the northernmost village in Myanmar, inhabited year round by ethnic Tibetans of northern Kachin State, in extreme northern Myanmar (formerly Burma). The village, at an elevation of 1200 m, is surrounded by snow-capped mountains, rising to the highest peak of Myanmar, Mt. Hkakabo Razi at 5880 m. Tahaundam is briefly described by the WCS. Between Tahaundam and Nogmung are several smaller villages with local ethnic groups (e.g., Lisu, Rawang).

== Climate ==
Tahaundam has a humid subtropical highland climate (Köppen climate classification Cwb). Temperatures are relatively mild throughout the year. Tahaundam is a very foggy village around the whole year.
