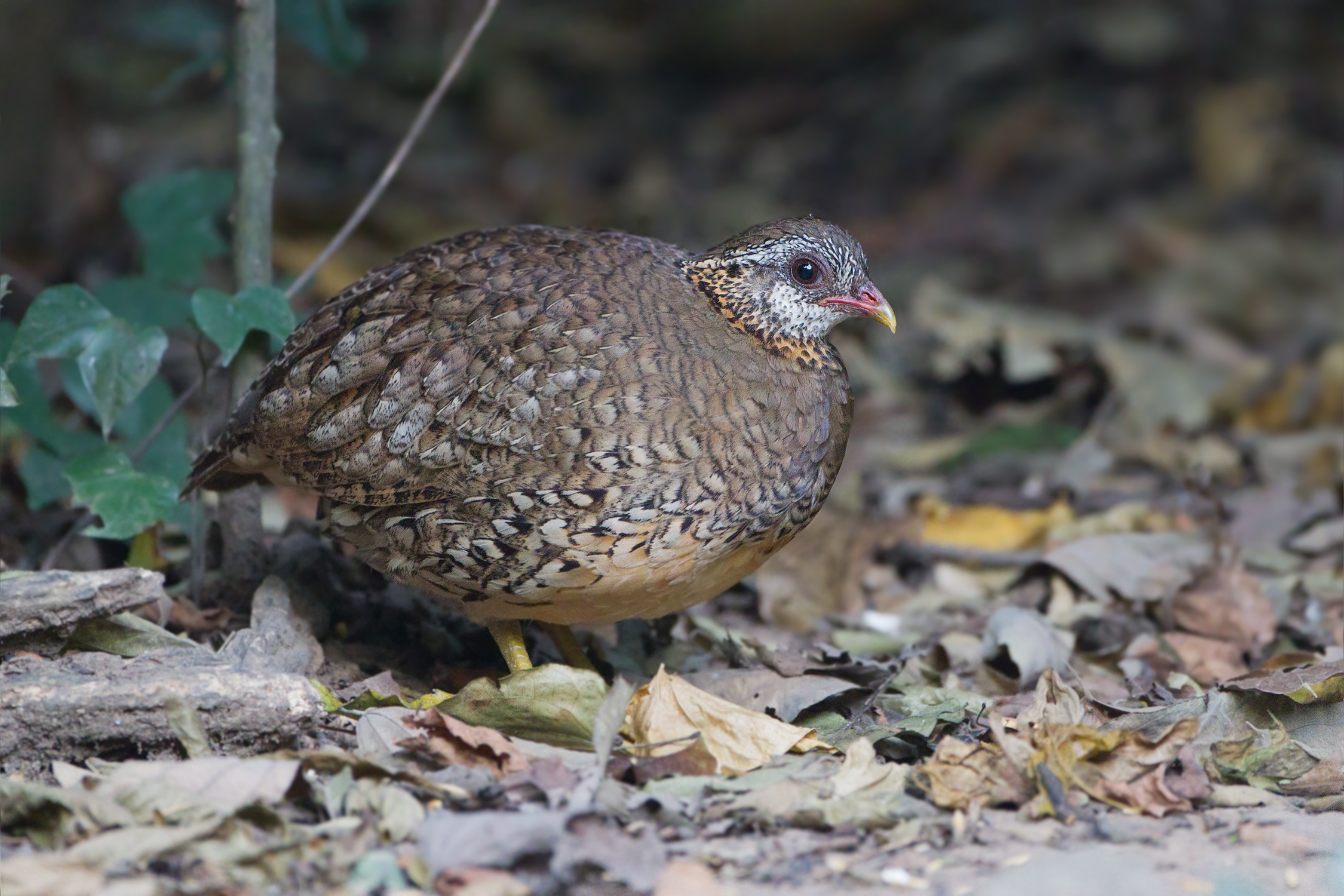

Conservation status
- Least Concern (IUCN 3.1)

Scientific classification
- Kingdom: Animalia
- Phylum: Chordata
- Class: Aves
- Order: Galliformes
- Family: Phasianidae
- Genus: Tropicoperdix
- Species: T. chloropus

Binomial name
- Tropicoperdix chloropus Blyth, 1859

= Green-legged partridge =

Species of bird

The green-legged partridge (Tropicoperdix chloropus), also known as the scaly-breasted partridge or green-legged hill-partridge, is a bird species in the family Phasianidae. It is found in forest in Indochina, ranging slightly into southernmost China (Yunnan). The Vietnam partridge is now usually considered a subspecies.
