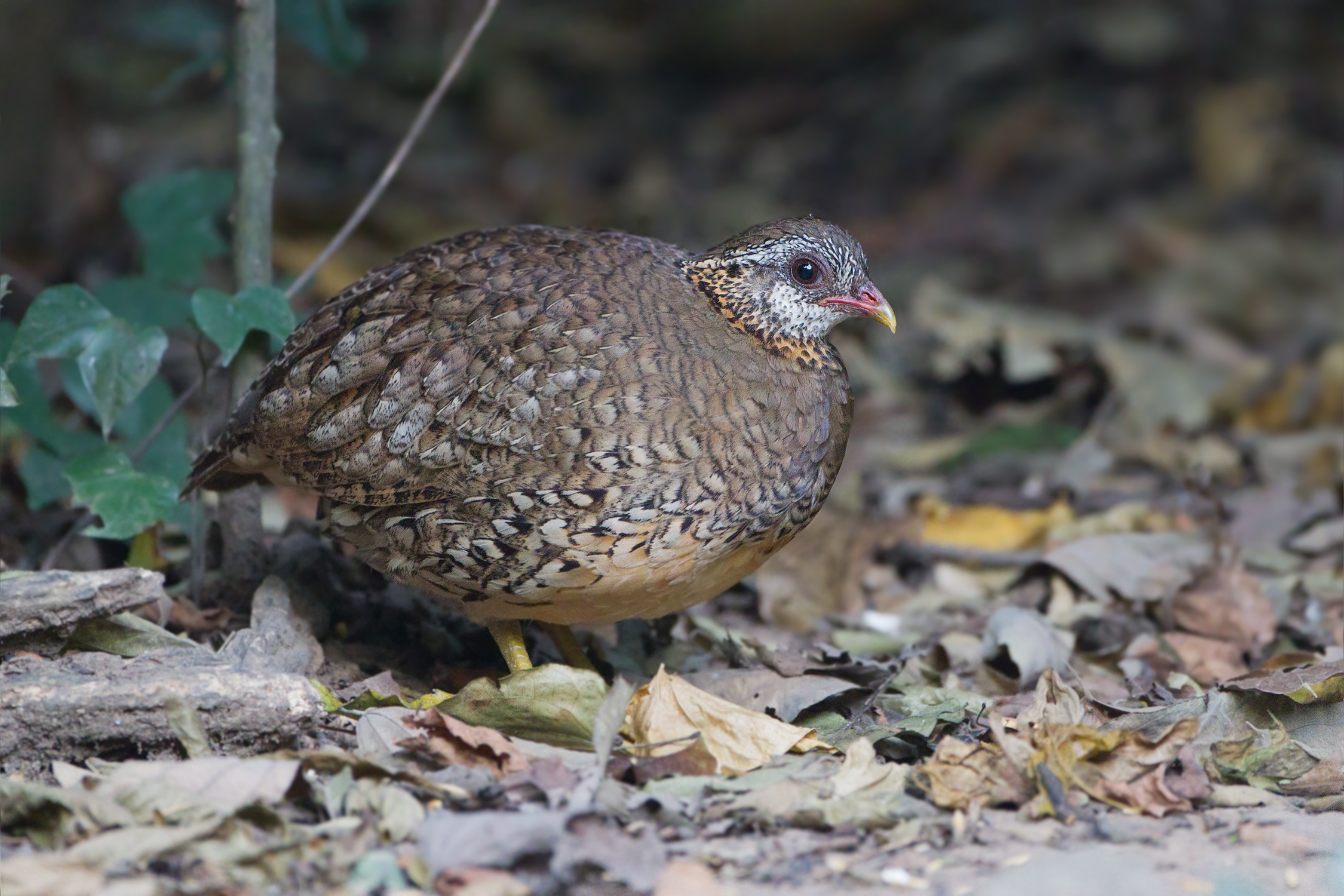
- Green-legged partridge (T. chloropus)

Scientific classification
- Kingdom: Animalia
- Phylum: Chordata
- Class: Aves
- Order: Galliformes
- Family: Phasianidae
- Subfamily: Phasianinae
- Genus: Tropicoperdix; Blyth, 1859

Type species
- Tetrao charltonii Eyton, 1845

Species
- Tropicoperdix charltonii; Tropicoperdix chloropus

= Tropicoperdix =

Genus of birds

Tropicoperdix is a genus of three species of birds in the pheasant family, Phasianidae. Although formerly classified in the now-defunct subfamily Perdicinae, phylogenetic evidence supports them being a sister group to the tribe Polyplectronini. They are referred to as East Asian forest partridges.

== Species ==
- Chestnut-necklaced partridge, Tropicoperdix charltonii
- Sabah partridge, Tropicoperdix graydoni
- Green-legged partridge, Tropicoperdix chloropus
