= Bukit Rimbang Bukit Baling Wildlife Sanctuary =

Protected area in Indonesia

Coordinates: 0°17′45″S 101°4′10″E

Bukit Rimbang Bukit Baling Wildlife Sanctuary is an IUCN Category IV protected area that covers 1.360 square kilometers. it is located in Riau, specifically in Kampar Kiri Hulu and Kampar Kiri that located in Kampar Regency and also covered in Singingi Hilir, Singingi, and Hulu Kuantan that located in Kuantan Singingi Regency, Riau. It was designated a wildlife reserve in 1982 and established by government on 2014.
