= Pierre Jabouille =

French ornithologist (1875–1947)

Pierre Charles Edmond Jabouille
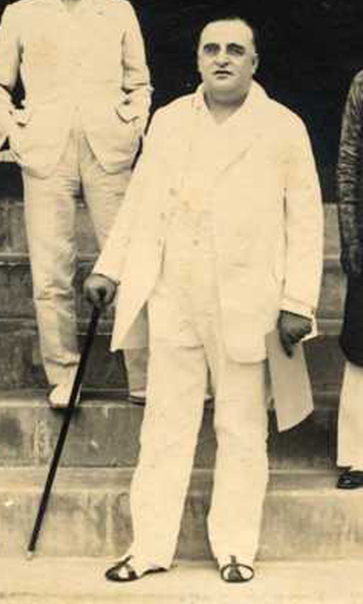
- Born: 25 November 1875; Saintes, Charente‑Maritime, France
- Died: 15 May 1947 (aged 71); Paris, France
- Occupations: Colonial administrator, Ornithologist
- Years active: 1905–1933 (administration), continued ornithology until WWII
- Employer: French colonial administration
- Known for: Ornithological expeditions and bird descriptions in French Indochina
- Awards: Tchihatchef Prize (Paris Academy of Sciences, 1928)

Pierre Charles Edmond Jabouille (25 November 1875 – 15 May 1947) was a French colonial administrator in Indochina and took an interest in the ornithology of the region, describing numerous new species.

Jabouille was born in Saintes, Département Charente-Maritime, son of a judge and later chairman of the cabinet of the prefecture of Calvados department Louis Arthur Jabouille (1842-1887) and Emma Jenny née Lejeune. He went to study law and worked at Barcelonnette. He moved to Indochina in 1905 as an administrative officer living in Lào Cai, Quảng Trị and serving as a mayor of Hanoi. He rose to become a governor. He also took an interest in the birds of the region and made expeditions along with Jean Théodore Delacour between 1923 and 1933, sometimes also Willoughby Prescott Lowe (1872-1949) and collected numerous bird specimens. He also described several new taxa. In 1928, the Paris Academy of Sciences awarded the Tchihatchef prize to Delacour and Jabouille for their work. After retirement in 1933, he settled in Château de Clères and continued to work with Jean Delacour until the outbreak of the Second World War. He became nearly blind and was unable to walk in later life and died in Paris.

Species described by Jabouille and Delacour include:

- Arborophila merlini (Delacour & Jabouille, 1924)
- Arborophila cambodiana Delacour & Jabouille, 1928
- Myiomela cambodiana (Delacour & Jabouille, 1928)
- Spelaeornis kinneari Delacour & Jabouille, 1930
- Sitta solangiae (Delacour & Jabouille, 1930)
- Napothera pasquieri (Delacour & Jabouille, 1930) (as Rimator pasquieri)
- Schoeniparus klossi (Delacour & Jabouille, 1931)
