= Tinjure-Milke-Jaljale area =

Rhododendron conservation area in eastern Nepal

Tinjure-Milke-Jaljale area is a protected area in Nepal that was established in July 1998. The area comprises three districts: Tehrathum, Sankhuwasabha and Taplejung. The area covers around 237,800 hectares consisting of the Eastern Himalayan Alpine Shrub and Meadows, and the Eastern Himalayan Broadleaf and Conifer Forests which function as corridor connecting Makalu-Barun National Park with the Kangchenjunga Conservation Area.
