= Nogmung Township =

Naungmoon Township နောင်မွန်းမြို့နယ်
- Township
- Location in PutaO district

- Location in Burma
- Coordinates: 27°30′N 97°49′E
- Country: Burma
- State: Kachin State
- District: Putao District
- Capital: Nogmung
- Time zone: UTC+6.30 (MST)

Nogmung (Burmese: နောင်မွန်းမြို့နယ်) is a township of Putao District in the Kachin State of Myanmar. The principal town is Nogmung.
