= Hkakabo Razi =

Highest mountain in Myanmar

- ခါကာဘိုရာဇီ
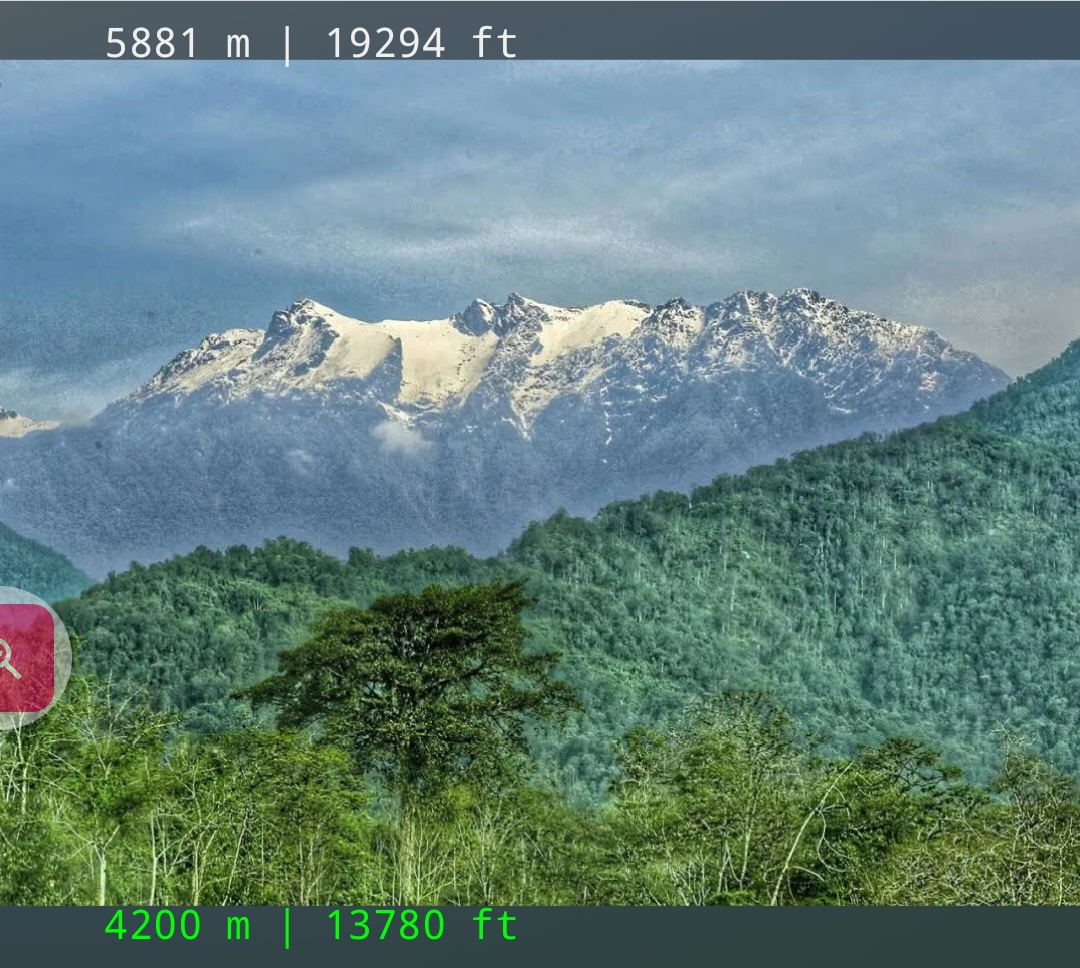
- Mt. Khakaborazi viewed from the south

Highest point
- Elevation: 19,295 ft (5,881 m)
- Prominence: 1,439 m (4,721 ft)
- Listing: Country high point
- Coordinates: 28°19′42″N 97°32′08″E

Geography
- Location within Myanmar Location within Tibet
- Location: Kachin, Myanmar; Tibet, China
- Parent range: Eastern Himalayas

Climbing
- First ascent: 15 September 1996
- Easiest route: snow/ice climb

Hkakabo Razi (Burmese: ခါကာဘိုရာဇီ, pronounced [kʰàkàbò ɹàzì]) is Myanmar's highest mountain. The 19,295-foot (5,881 m)-tall mountain is the highest mountain in Southeast Asia as well. It is located in the northern Myanmar state of Kachin in an outlying subrange of the Greater Himalayan mountain system near the border tripoint with India (Arunachal Pradesh) and China (Tibet Autonomous Region). Its highest status has recently been challenged by 19,258-foot (5,870 m)-tall Gamlang Razi, located about 4.1 miles (6.6 km) WSW on the Chinese border.

Administratively, it lies in Dahangdan, Nogmung Township, Putao District, Kachin state. The peak is enclosed within Khakaborazi National Park. The park is entirely mountainous and is characterized by broad-leaved evergreen tropical rain forest at low altitudes, a sub-tropical temperate zone from 8,000 to 9,000 ft (2,400–2,700 m), then broad-leaved, semi-deciduous forest and finally needle-leaved evergreen, snow forest. Above 11,000 ft (3,400 m), the highest forest zone is alpine, different from the forest not only in kind but in history and origin. Above 15,000 ft (4,600 m), cold, barren, windswept terrain and permanent snow and glaciers dominate. At around 17,500 ft (5,300 m), there is a large ice cap with several outlet glaciers.

== Environmental protection ==
Hkakabo Razi was established as a natural reserve on January 30, 1996, and as a national park on November 10, 1998. The Khakaborazi National Park is the last stronghold for biodiversity in Myanmar. Diverse flora and fauna ranging from lowland tropical species to alpine species still await proper research and identification. Due to this, the park is an excellent center for field study for students of botany, geology, zoology, and geography.

A study was done by the Forest Department with the assistance of Wildlife Conservation Society of New York during 1997 and 1998. The results have been presented in ICIMOD sponsored Workshop "Sub-regional Consultation on Conservation of Hkakabo Razi Mountain Ecosystems in Eastern Himalayas", held in Putao, Myanmar during 25–29 October 1999. This was followed in 2001 with an international, interdisciplinary team of scientists from the California Academy of Sciences in San Francisco, National Geographic Society, Harvard University, the Chinese Academy of Sciences, and the Myanmar Forestry Ministry. On 11 September 2001, herpetologist Joseph Slowinski, team leader from California Academy of Sciences, was bitten by a venomous krait and died in the field.

In 2002–2003, P. Christiaan Klieger, an anthropologist from the California Academy of Sciences, and photographer Dong Lin retraced their previous steps and succeeded in making the first anthropological survey of the Hkakabo Razi region. On foot, they reached the northernmost village in Myanmar, Tahaundam, which is inhabited by about 200 Khampa Tibetans, including mountaineer Nyama Gyaltsen (see below).

Only a few Westerners ever made it to Mt. Hkakabo Razi, the National Park or anywhere close to it. Captain B.E.A. Pritchard was the first Westerner to visit the Alun Dung valley, in 1913.

== Climbing history ==
In 1906, British botanist Frank Kingdon-Ward reached the headwaters of the Irrawaddy, sparking British colonial interest in surveying the mountains nearby. The height of the mountain was measured during colonial rule — first by Petters from a distance measuring the elevation to be 19,269 feet and a second survey from closer to the foot of the mountain measuring it at 19,315 feet with the help of local porters. Kingdon-Ward attempted to climb the peak in 1937, but misjudged his approach and ended up on the Dundi Yayway range instead.

In 1955, Burma sent a military column called the Yei Nwe Parr column to attempt the mountain. They learnt from the locals that the mountain was known to them as Ahtum Bum and that the locals did not see any reason to climb such a steep and dangerous mountain with no resources at the peak. From Kingdon-Ward's attempt they believed that the south face was unclimbable, and therefore approached from the Ransawam river valley. The column only reached up to 12,000 feet in their attempt, mostly due to weather and rough terrain.

Takashi Ozaki (Japan, 1951 – May 12, 2011) and Nyima Gyaltsen (aka "Aung Tse"; Myanmar) made the first ascent in 1996. Ozaki had attempted the mountain in 1995 but turned back due to bad weather. The route to basecamp is long (four weeks) and arduous through a dense rain forest with many unbridged stream crossings. The recentness of the first ascent can also be attributed to the policy that foreigners were not allowed into the area until 1993.

In 2013, the nearby peak of Gamlang Razi was climbed and measured at 5,870 m (19,260 ft) using an advanced version of GPS, making it possibly the highest in Myanmar. Ozaki had confirmed Hkakabo's height as 5881 m, but he did not yet have the GPS equipment to measure the exact height of Hkakabo Razi.

In August 2014 an all-Burmese expedition took a new route up the north face. Two team-members, Ko Aung Myint Myat and Ko Wai Yan Min Thu, reached the summit on August 31 for the second ascent of the mountain, placing a flag, plaque and Buddha image at the summit. The climbers ran out of battery power right after reaching the summit, and radio contact was lost. After they failed to return to the lower camps, a rescue operation was launched. The search for the missing climbers continued into October. It involved a helicopter crash landing, leading to the death of one pilot and an 11-day survival trek by the other pilot and the passenger mountaineer.

In November 2014, a National Geographic Society / The North Face sponsored expedition set out to measure the height of Hkakabo Razi using the same equipment as the Gamlang Razi team. The 2014 group was led by Hilaree Nelson, and also included Mark Jenkins, Cory Richards, Renan Ozturk, Emily Harrington and Taylor Rees. On November 7, 2014, Jenkins and Ozturk made the final attempt at the summit but turned back at 5,742 m (18,839 ft). They estimated that the summit was an additional 800 ft (240 m) higher.

In August 2018 it was announced that three Myanmar mountaineers would ascend the mountain sometime that year, but for various reasons, the team postponed the climb until further notice.

== See also ==
- List of mountains in Myanmar
- List of Southeast Asian mountains
- Hkakaborazi National Park
- Gamlang Razi
