= List of airports in Myanmar =

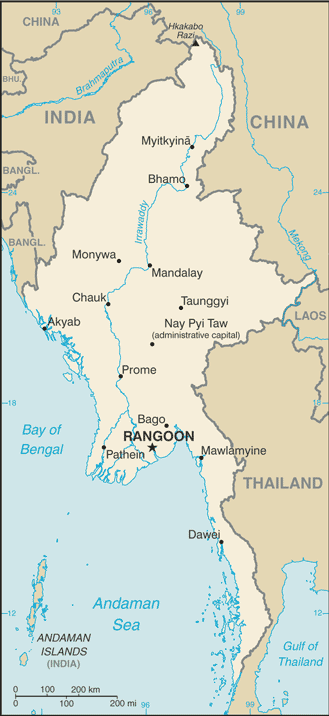
Map of Burma (Myanmar)

This is a list of airports in Myanmar (Burma), grouped by type and sorted by location.

Due to the impact of the Myanmar civil war, many airports have suspended operations.

The country is bordered by People's Republic of China to the northeast, Laos to the east, Thailand to the southeast, Bangladesh to the west, India to the northwest, the Bay of Bengal to the southwest, and the Andaman Sea to the south. The country is divided into 14 administrative subdivisions, which include 7 states (pyi-ne) and 7 divisions (tyne). Its capital is Naypyitaw (Nay Pyi Taw) and its largest city (and prior capital) is Yangon.

Department of Civil Aviation will publish statistic data for every airports with commercial flights every month, the data includes number of flights, international and domestic passenger and cargo traffics, etc.

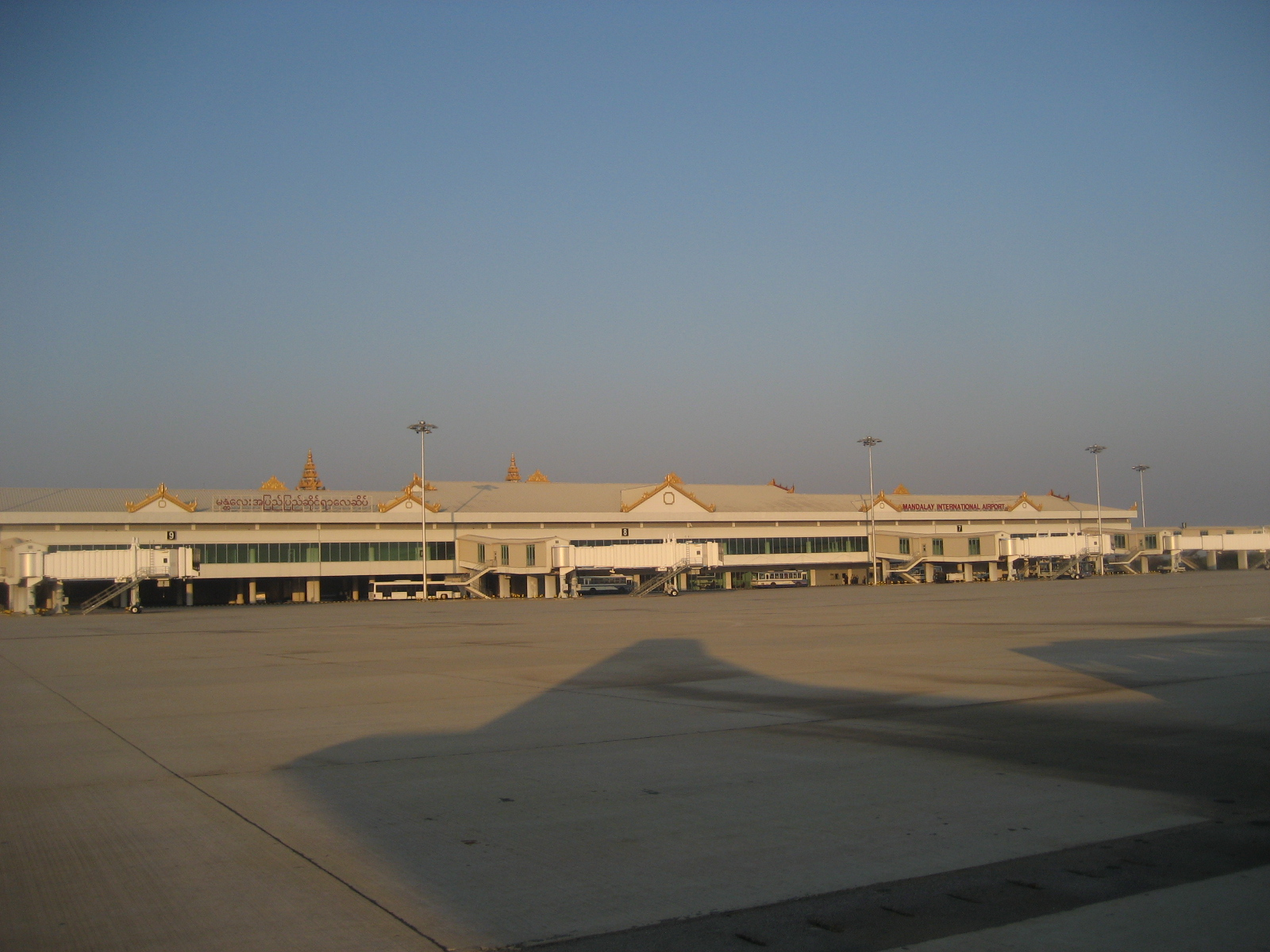
Mandalay Airport

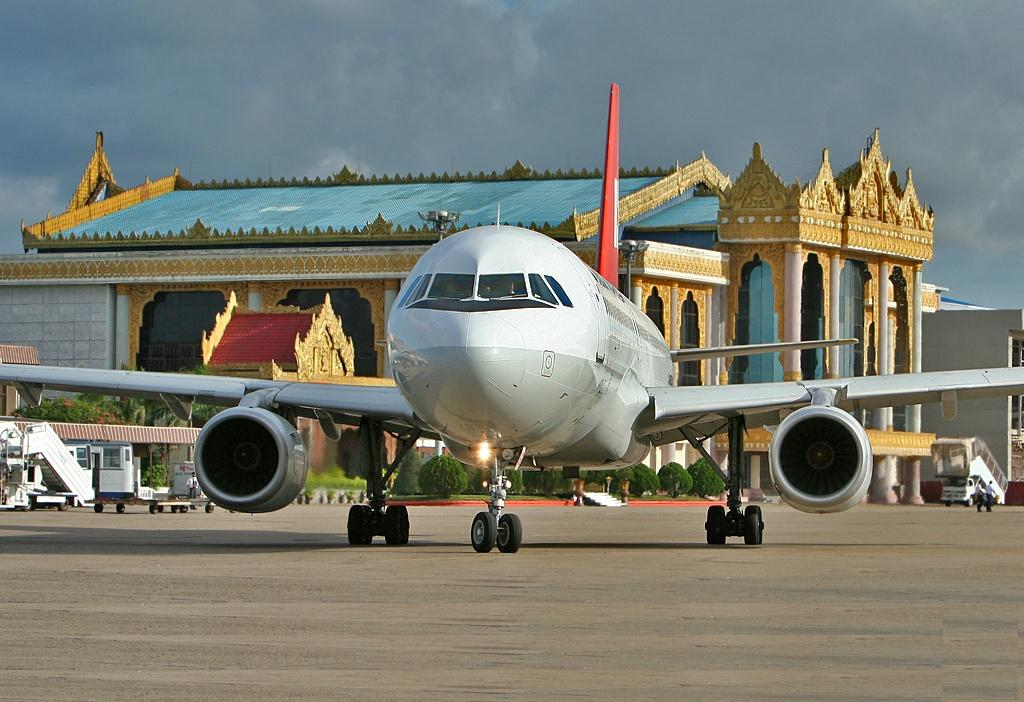
Yangon Airport

== Airports ==
Airport names shown in bold have scheduled passenger service on commercial airlines.

| Location served | Region/State | ICAO | IATA | Airport name | Coordinates |
International airports
| Mandalay / Tada-U | Mandalay Region | VYMD | MDL | **Mandalay International Airport** | 21°42′07″N 095°58′40″E |
| Yangon (Rangoon) | Yangon Region | VYYY | RGN | **Yangon International Airport** | 16°54′26″N 096°07′59″E |
| Naypyidaw (Naypyitaw) | Mandalay Region | VYNT | NYT | **Nay Pyi Taw International Airport** (Ela Airport) | 19°37′24″N 096°12′03″E |
| Bago (Bago) | Bago Region | | | Hanthawaddy International Airport (Under Construction) | 17°18′4″N 096°25′41″E |
Domestic airports
| Ann | Rakhine State | VYAN | VBA | **Ann Airport** | 19°46′08″N 094°01′34″E |
| Bagan / Nyaung-U | Mandalay Region | VYBG | NYU | **Nyaung U Airport** | 21°10′43″N 094°55′48″E |
| Bhamo (Banmaw) | Kachin State | VYBM | BMO | **Bhamo Airport** (Banmaw Airport) | 24°16′15″N 097°14′49″E |
| Bokpyin (Bokepyin) | Tanintharyi Region | VYBP | | Bokpyin Airport | 11°16′N 098°46′E |
| Mandalay | Mandalay Region | VYCZ | VBC | Chanmyathazi Airport | 21°56′25″N 096°05′22″E |
| Dawei (Tavoy) | Tanintharyi Region | VYDW | TVY | **Dawei Airport** | 14°06′13″N 098°12′13″E |
| Heho | Shan State | VYHH | HEH | **Heho Airport** | 20°44′49″N 096°47′31″E |
| Homalin (Hommalin) | Sagaing Region | VYHL | HOX | Homalin Airport (Hommalin Airport) | 24°53′58″N 094°54′50″E |
| Kalay (Kale) | Sagaing Region | VYKL | KMV | **Kalaymyo Airport** | 23°11′19″N 094°03′03″E |
| Kawthaung (Kawthoung) | Tanintharyi Region | VYKT | KAW | **Kawthaung Airport** | 10°02′57″N 098°32′16″E |
| Kengtung (Kengtong, Kyaingtong) | Shan State | VYKG | KET | **Kengtung Airport** | 21°18′05″N 099°38′09″E |
| Khamti | Sagaing Region | VYKI | KHM | **Khamti Airport** | 25°59′18″N 095°40′28″E |
| Kyaukpyu (Kyauk Pyu) | Rakhine State | VYKP | KYP | **Kyaukpyu Airport** | 19°25′35″N 093°32′05″E |
| Lashio | Shan State | VYLS | LSH | **Lashio Airport** | 22°58′40″N 097°45′07″E |
| Loikaw | Kayah State | VYLK | LIW | **Loikaw Airport** | 19°41′29″N 097°12′53″E |
| Magwe | Magway Region | VYMW | MWQ | **Magwe Airport** | 20°09′56″N 094°56′28″E |
| Manaung | Rakhine State | VYMN | MGU | **Manaung Airport** | 18°50′45″N 093°41′20″E |
| Mawlamyine (Mawlamyaing) | Mon State | VYMM | MNU | **Mawlamyaing Airport** (Mawlamyine Airport) | 16°26′41″N 097°39′38″E |
| Mong Hsat (Monghsat) | Shan State | VYMS | MOG | **Monghsat Airport** (Mong Hsat Airport) | 20°31′00″N 099°15′24″E |
| Monywa (Monywar) | Sagaing Region | VYMY | NYW | Monywa Airport (Monywar Airport) | 22°14′N 095°07′E |
| Myeik (Mergui) | Tanintharyi Region | VYME | MGZ | **Myeik Airport** | 12°26′23″N 098°37′17″E |
| Myitkyina | Kachin State | VYMK | MYT | **Myitkyina Airport** | 25°23′01″N 097°21′06″E |
| Pathein (Bassein) | Ayeyarwady Region | VYPN | BSX | **Pathein Airport** | 16°48′54″N 094°46′47″E |
| Putao | Kachin State | VYPT | PBU | **Putao Airport** | 27°19′47″N 097°25′34″E |
| Sittwe (Akyab) | Rakhine State | VYSW | AKY | **Sittwe Airport** | 20°07′57″N 092°52′21″E |
| Falam (Surbung) | Chin State | VYFS | SUR | Surbung Airport (Under construction) | 22.939167°N 93.615333°E |
| Tachileik (Tachilek) | Shan State | VYTL | THL | **Tachilek Airport** | 20°29′01″N 099°56′07″E |
| Thandwe (Sandoway) | Rakhine State | VYTD | SNW | **Thandwe Airport** | 18°27′38″N 094°18′00″E |
Military airports
| Anisakan | Mandalay Region | VYAS | | Anisakan Airport | 21°57′19″N 096°24′21″E |
| Coco Islands (Great Coco Island) | Yangon Region | VYCI | | Coco Island Airport | 14°08′29″N 093°22′06″E |
| Hmawbi (Hmawby) | Yangon Region | VYHB | | Hmawbi Air Base | 17°07′N 96°04′E |
| Hpa-an (Pa-An) | Kayin State | VYPA | PAA | Hpa-An Airport | 16°53′37″N 097°40′28″E |
| Kyauktu (Kyaukhtu) | Magway Region | VYXG | | Kyauktu South Airport | 21°24′26″N 094°07′31″E |
| Meiktila | Mandalay Region | VYML | | Meiktila Air Base | 20°53′N 095°53′E |
| Meiktila | Mandalay Region | VYST | | Shante Air Base | 20°56′30″N 095°54′52″E |
| Myitkyina | Kachin State | VYNP | | Nampong Air Base | 25°21′15″N 097°17′42″E |
| Namsang | Shan State | VYNS | NSG | Namsang Air Base | 20°53′20″N 97°44′10″E |
| Pakokku | Magway Region | VYPU | PKK | **Pakokku Airport** | 21°24′N 095°06′E |
| Taungoo | Bago Division | VYTO | TGO | Taungoo Air Base | 19°01′48″N 96°25′00″E |
Disused airports
| Gangaw | Magway Region | VYGG | GAW | Gangaw Airport | 22°10′29″N 094°08′04″E |
| Gwa | Rakhine State | VYGW | GWA | Gwa Airport | 17°36′N 094°35′E |
| Hpapun (Papun) | Kayin State | VYPP | PPU | Hpapun Airport | 18°04′N 097°27′E |
| Kyauktu (Kyaukhtu) | Magway Region | VYKU | KYT | Kyauktu Airport | 21°24′45″N 094°08′31″E |
| Lanywa | Magway Region | VYLY | | Lanywa Airport | 20°56′25″N 094°49′21″E |
| Momeik | Shan State | VYMO | MOE | Momeik Airport | 23°05′33″N 096°38′42″E |
| Mong Ton (Mong-Tong) | Shan State | VYMT | MGK | Mong Ton Airport | 20°17′48″N 098°53′56″E |
| Namsang | Shan State | VYNS | NMS | Namsang Airport | 20°53′25″N 097°44′09″E |
| Namtu | Shan State | VYNU | NMT | Namtu Airport | 23°05′N 097°23′E |
| Nogmung (Nogmung) | Kachin State | VYNM | N0M | **Nogmung Airport** (Nogmung Airport) | 27°30′00″N 097°49′00″E |
| Pauk | Magway Region | VYPK | PAU | Pauk Airport | 21°26′57″N 094°29′13″E |
| Pyay (Prome) | Bago Region | VYPY | PRU | Pyay Airport | 18°49′28″N 095°15′57″E |
| Tilin | Magway Region | VYHN | TIO | Tilin Airport | 21°42′N 094°06′E |
| Ye | Mon State | VYYE | XYE | Ye Airport | 15°18′N 097°52′E |

== See also ==
- Myanmar Air Force
- Transport in Burma
- List of airports by ICAO code: V#VY - Myanmar (Burma)
- Wikipedia:WikiProject Aviation/Airline destination lists: Asia#Myanmar (Burma)
- List of airlines of Burma
