= Myanmar National Airlines =

Flag carrier of Myanmar

Myanmar National Airlines မြန်မာအမျိုးသားလေကြောင်း

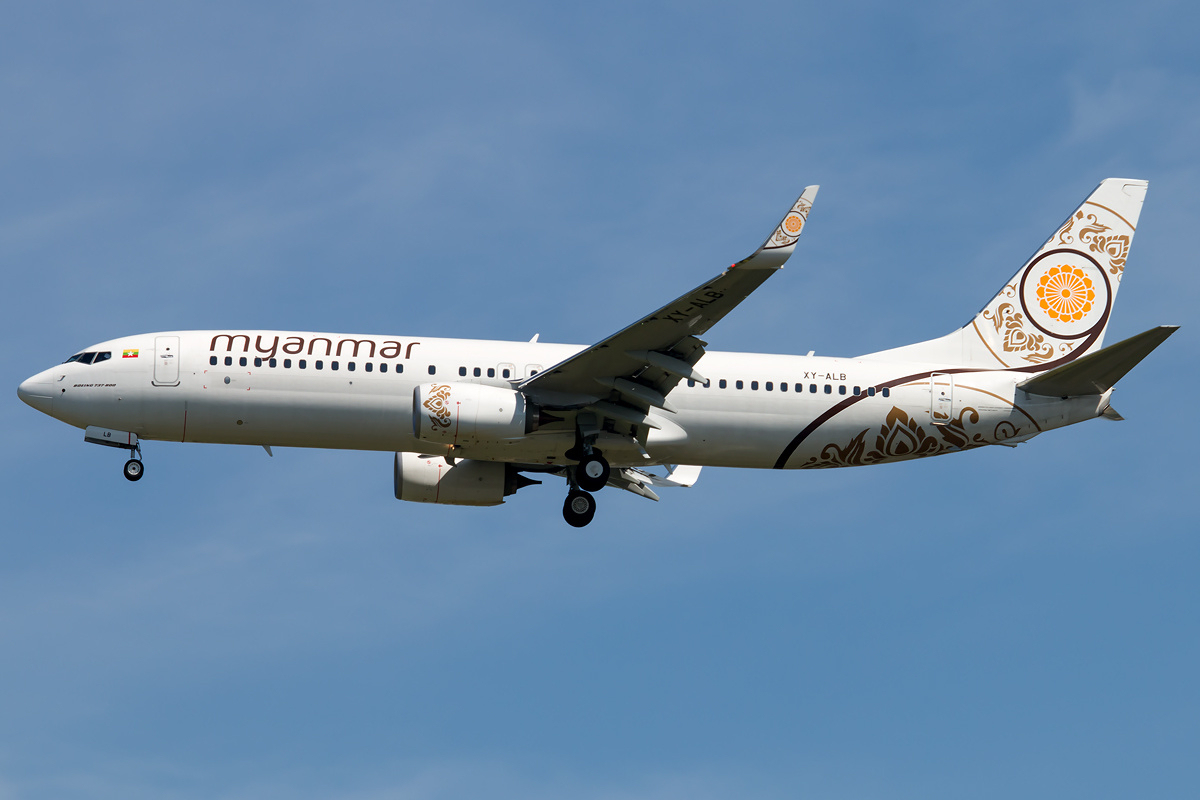
- A Myanmar National Airlines Boeing 737-800
IATA	ICAO	Call sign
UB	UBA	UNIONAIR
- Founded: 15 September 1948; 78 years ago (as Union of Burma Airways)
- Hubs: Yangon International Airport
- Secondary hubs: Mandalay International Airport
- Focus cities: Mandalay International Airport
- Frequent-flyer program: MNA Club
- Fleet size: 11
- Destinations: 36
- Parent company: Ministry of Transport and Communications
- Headquarters: Yangon, Myanmar
- Key people: Capt. Khup Khan Mung (CEO)
- Revenue: ▲$40.2 million
- Operating income: ▲233.75 billion MMK (2022)
- Net income: ▲14,141 billion MMK (2022)
- Employees: 12,000
- Website: www.flymna.com

Myanmar National Airlines (Burmese: မြန်မာအမျိုးသားလေကြောင်း), formerly Union of Burma Airways, Burma Airways, and Myanma Airways, is a state-owned airline and the flag carrier of Myanmar, based in Yangon. Founded in 1948, the airline operates scheduled services to all major domestic destinations and to regional destinations in Asia. Its main base is Yangon International Airport and Mandalay International Airport.

== History ==
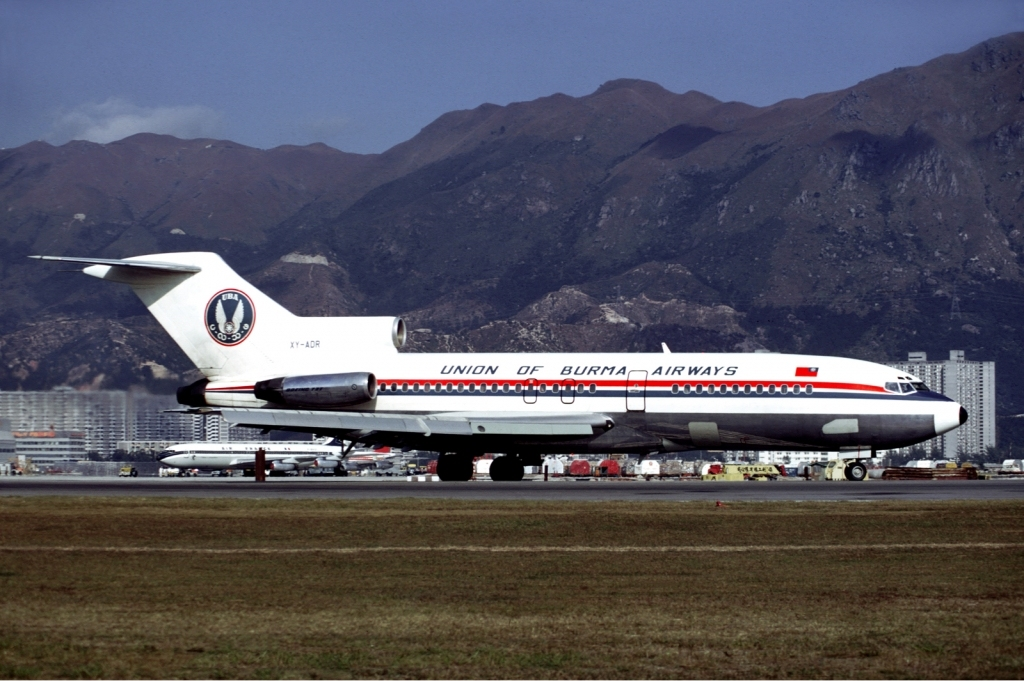
Union of Burma Airways Boeing 727 at Hong Kong Kai Tak Airport in 1974

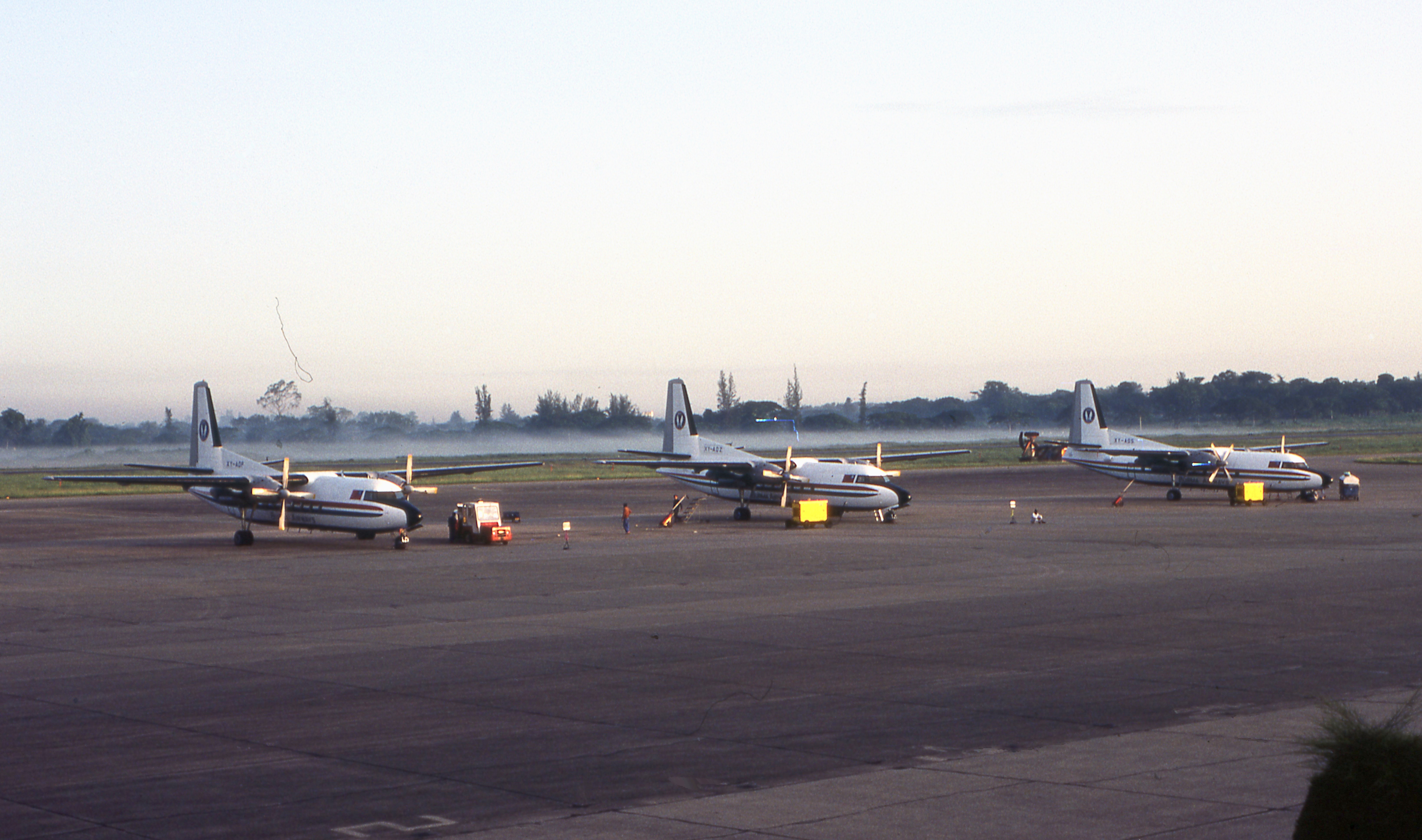
Lineup of Burma Airways Fokker F27 at Yangon International Airport in 1982

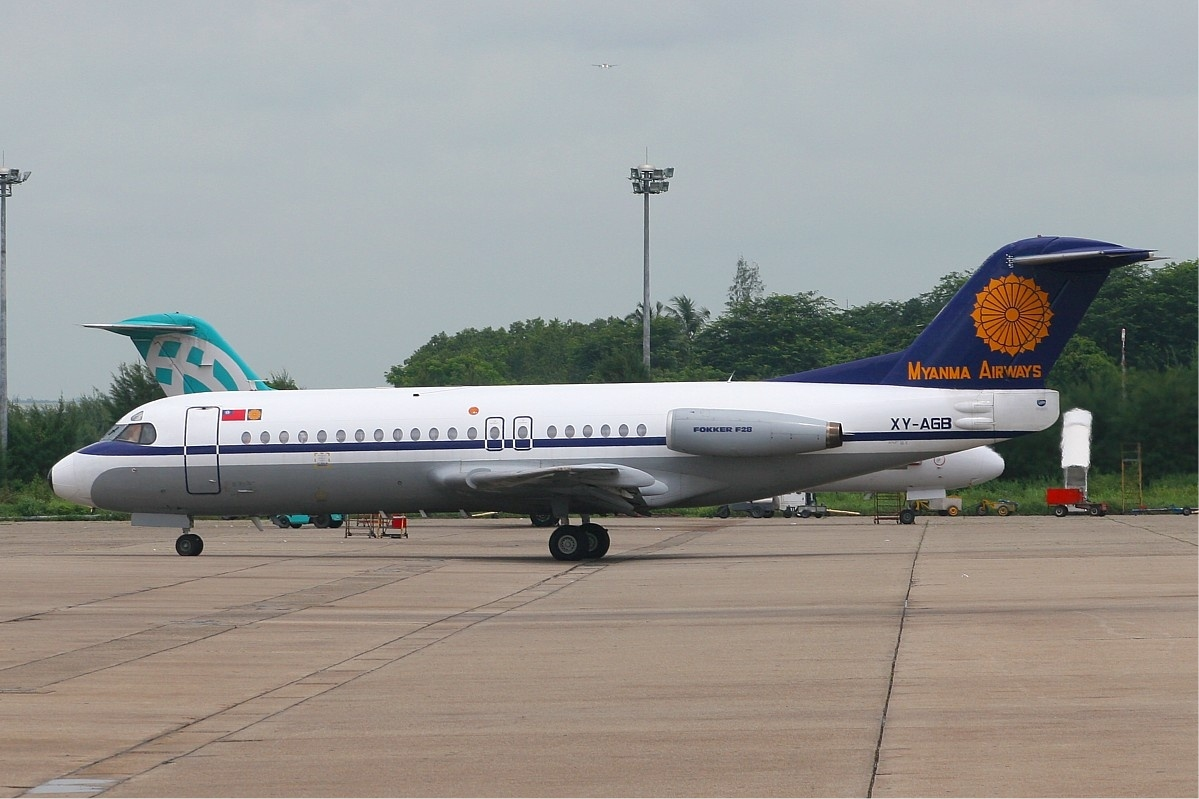
Myanma Airways' Fokker F28-4000 at Yangon International Airport in 2005

The airline was founded by the government after independence on 15 September 1948, as the Union of Burma Airways (UBA). It initially operated domestic flights only, but added limited international services to neighboring destinations in 1950. In 1993, the airline withdrew from its international routes. After a 23-year absence, it relaunched international flights in 2016 with service to Singapore. The name was changed to Burma Airways in December 1972, and to Myanma Airways on 1 April 1989, following the renaming of the country from Burma to Myanmar. International services of Myanma Airways have been made as a joint venture airline, Myanmar Airways International (MAI). Myanmar National Airlines is the majority shareholder of Joint Venture Company MAI, set up in 1993. In 2003, it was proposed to set up a Myanmar-based airline for chartered international passenger and cargo flights, which was planned to be called Air Myanmar. What would have been a joint-venture between Myanma Airways and private investors was abandoned in 2005. Myanmar National Airlines provides ground-handling services for other airlines' charter, scheduled and non scheduled flights.

In mid-2012, Myanma Airways ordered to lease two new Embraer 190AR from GE Civil Aviation Services Co. Ltd, that replaced its Fokker F-28 from November 2012. On February 11, 2014, at the Singapore Airshow, Myanma Airways signed a $960 million deal with GECAS for six Boeing 737-800s and four Boeing 737 MAX aircraft. The deal is the largest commercial sale by a U.S. company to Myanmar in decades and the largest single aircraft order in the history of Myanmar's aviation industry.

In December 2014, Myanmar Airways rebranded itself as Myanmar National Airlines.

Following the arrival of its first Boeing 737-800 in June 2015, Myanmar National Airlines announced the resumption of international services after a 22-year hiatus to Singapore, Hong Kong and Bangkok. International services resumed with the inaugural flight to Singapore on 19 August 2015. Myanmar National Airlines then launched its second international service to Hong Kong on 4 December 2015 following the arrival of its second Boeing 737-800. Myanmar National Airlines (MNA) sets to begin its flights between Yangon and Bangkok starting from February 20, 2016, marking Thailand as its third international destination.

== Destinations ==
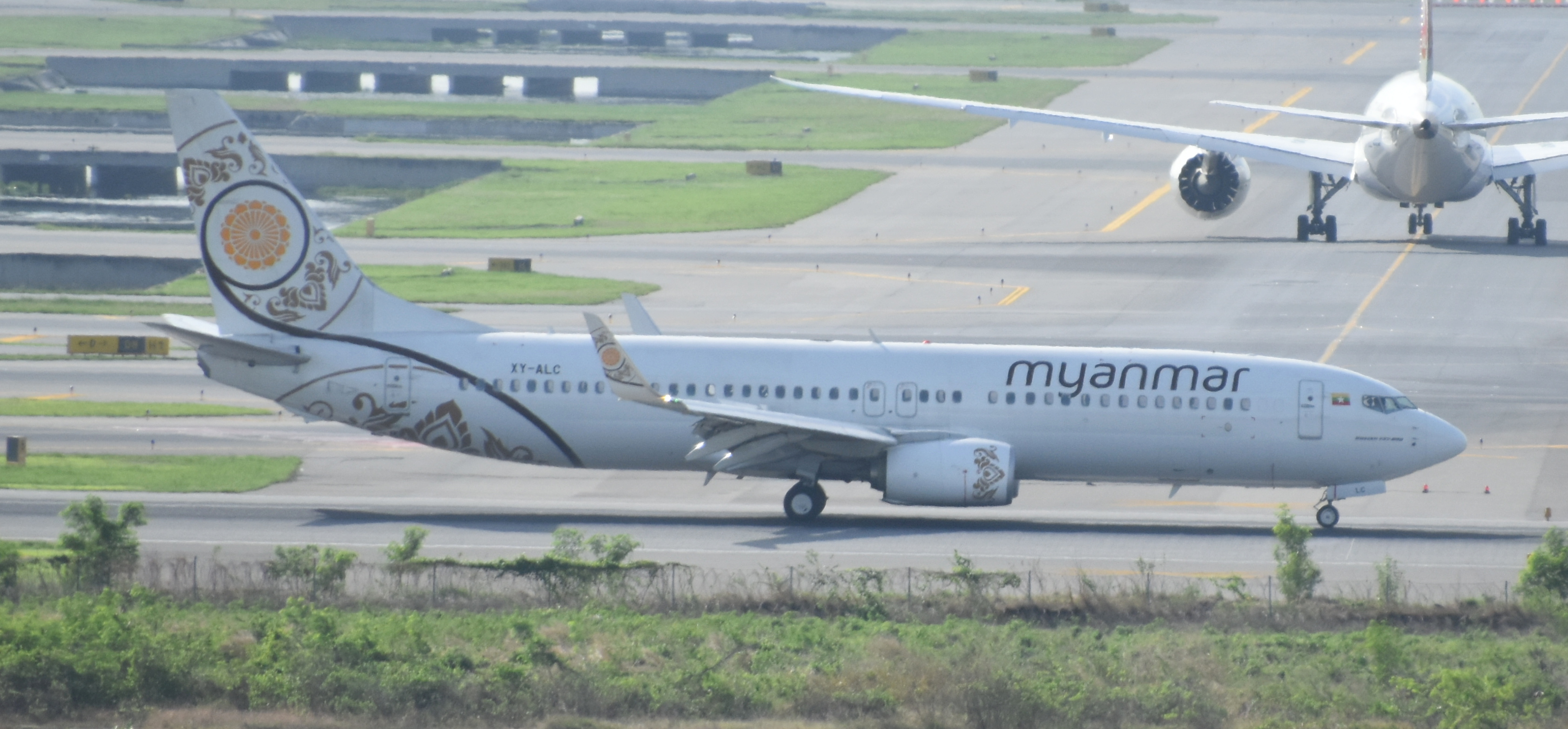
A Boeing 737-800 at Suvarnabhumi Airport (2016)

As of June 2025, Myanmar National Airlines flies (or has flown) to the following destinations:

Country	City	Airport	Notes	Refs
Cambodia	Phnom Penh	Phnom Penh International Airport	Terminated	
China	Beijing	Beijing Capital International Airport	Terminated	
China	Chengdu	Chengdu Shuangliu International Airport	Terminated	
China	Kunming	Kunming Changshui International Airport		
China	Hong Kong	Hong Kong International Airport	Terminated	
China	Mangshi	Dehong Mangshi International Airport		
India	Gaya	Gaya Airport	Seasonal	
Myanmar	Ann	Ann Airport		
Myanmar	Bagan	Nyaung U Airport		
Myanmar	Banmaw	Banmaw Airport		
Myanmar	Bokpyin	Bokpyin Airport		
Myanmar	Dawei	Dawei Airport		
Myanmar	Falam	Surbung Airport		
Myanmar	Heho	Heho Airport		
Myanmar	Homalin	Homalin Airport		
Myanmar	Kalaymyo	Kalaymyo Airport		
Myanmar	Kawthaung	Kawthaung Airport		
Myanmar	Kengtung	Kengtung Airport		
Myanmar	Hkamti	Khamti Airport		
Myanmar	Kyaukpyu	Kyaukpyu Airport		
Myanmar	Lashio	Lashio Airport	Terminated	
Myanmar	Loikaw	Loikaw Airport		
Myanmar	Magway	Magway Airport		
Myanmar	Manaung	Manaung Airport		
Myanmar	Mandalay	Mandalay International Airport	Hub	
Myanmar	Mawlamyaing	Mawlamyaing Airport		
Myanmar	Monghsat	Monghsat Airport		
Myanmar	Monywa	Monywa Airport		
Myanmar	Myeik	Myeik Airport		
Myanmar	Myitkyina	Myitkyina Airport		
Myanmar	Naypyidaw	Nay Pyi Taw International Airport		
Myanmar	Putao	Putao Airport		
Myanmar	Sittwe	Sittwe Airport		
Myanmar	Tachilek	Tachilek Airport		
Myanmar	Thandwe	Thandwe Airport		
Myanmar	Yangon	Yangon International Airport	Hub	
Singapore	Singapore	Changi Airport		
South Korea	Seoul	Incheon International Airport		
Thailand	Bangkok	Suvarnabhumi Airport		
Thailand	Bangkok	Don Mueang International Airport		
Thailand	Chiang Mai	Chiang Mai International Airport		

=== Interline agreements ===
Myanmar National Airlines has Interline agreements with the following airlines:

- Hahn Air
- Garuda Indonesia
- Japan Airlines
- Qatar Airways
- Thai Airways International
- Vietnam Airlines

== Fleet ==
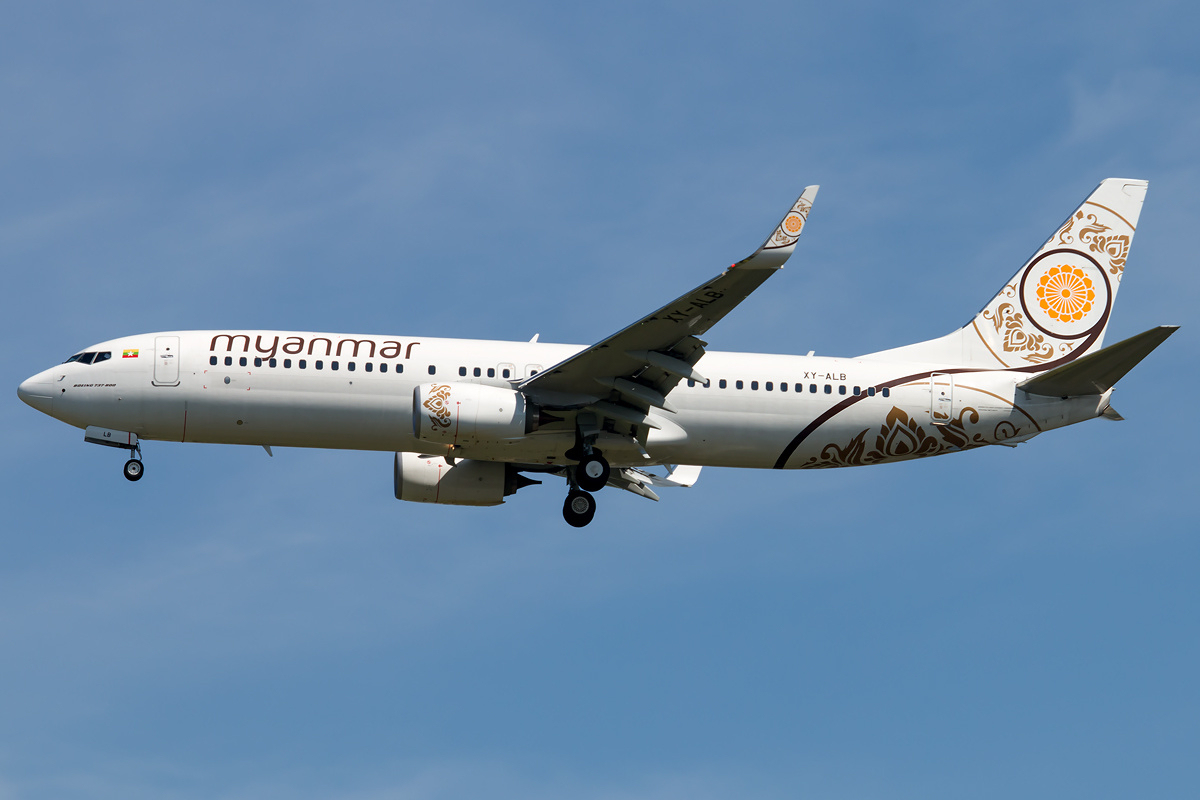
Boeing 737-800

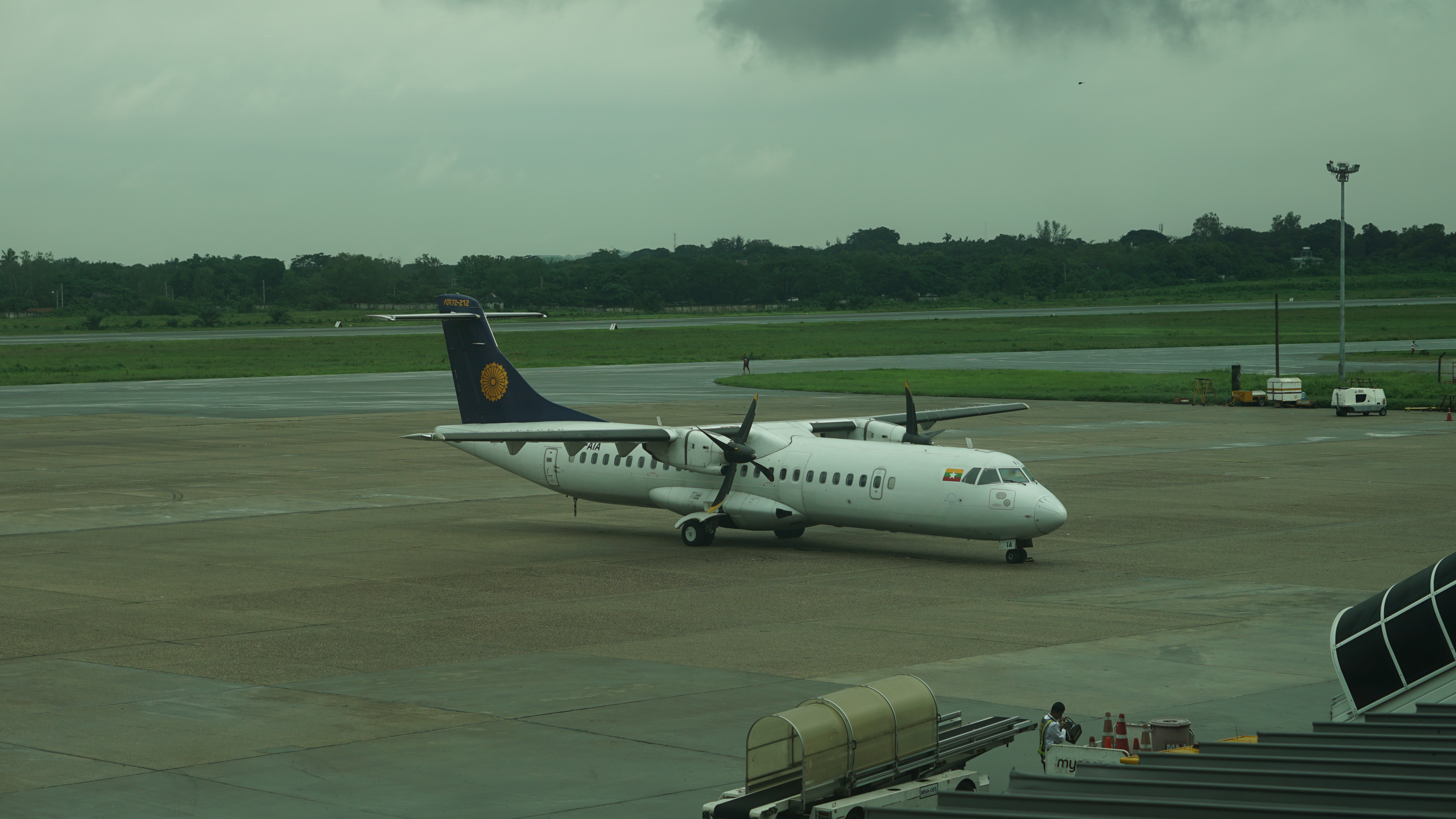
ATR 72-212A

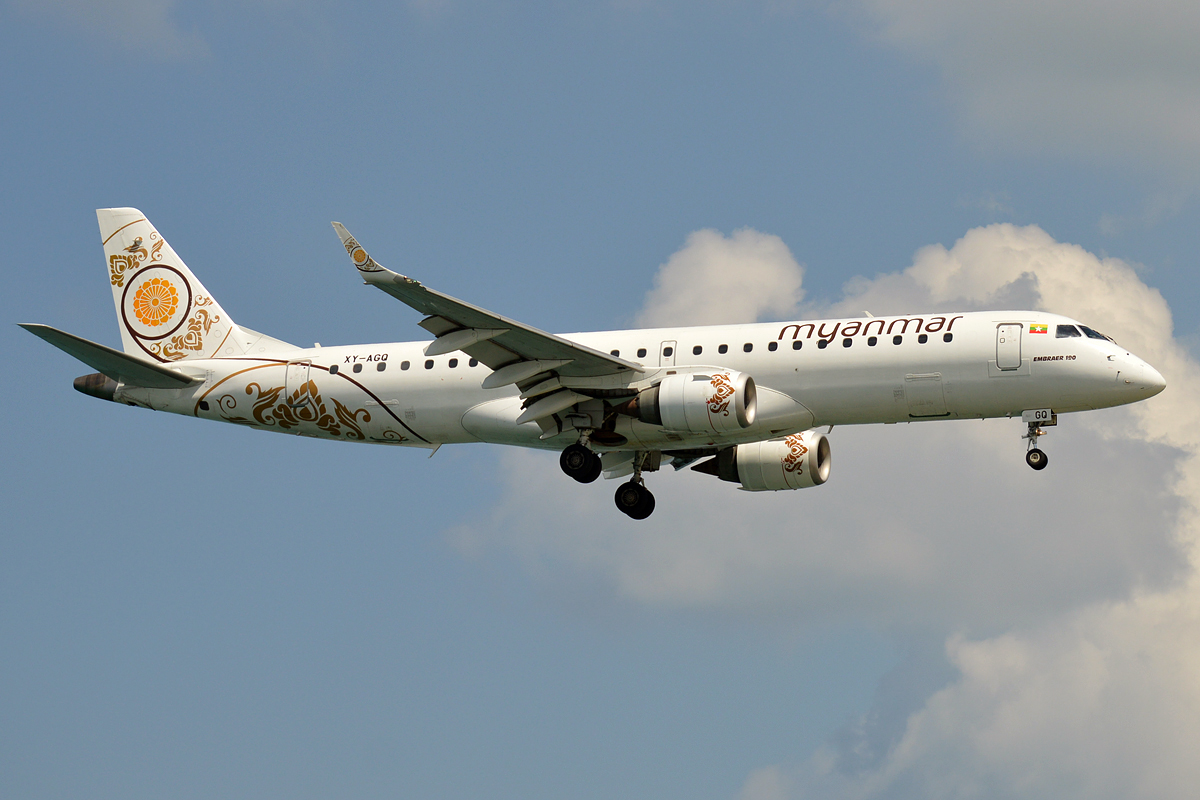
Former Embraer E190

=== Current fleet ===
As of June 2025, Myanmar National Airlines operates the following aircraft:

Aircraft	In service	Orders	Passengers				Notes
Aircraft	In service	Orders	C	Y+	Y	Total	Notes
ATR 72-600	8	—	—	—	72	72	
Boeing 737-800	2	—	8	—	156	164	XY-ALB - Leased from GE Capital Aviation Services.
Boeing 737-800	2	—	12	—	150	162	XY-ALV - Leased from Dubai Aerospace Enterprise. Former Garuda Indonesia aircraft. Currently stored in Kunming Changshui International Airport due to the incident.
Cargo
Boeing 737-800(F)	1	—	Cargo				9M-WCA - Leased from World Cargo Airlines
Total	11	–					

=== Former fleet ===
Myanmar National Airlines former fleet
Aircraft	Total	Year introduced	Year retired	Replacement	Notes/references
ATR 42-320	1	2014	2016	ATR 72-600	Taken by Myanmar Air Force.
ATR 72-200	2	2014	Unknown	Unknown	Taken by Myanmar Air Force.
ATR 72-500	1	2014	2019	ATR 72-600	Sold to Air Thanlwin.
Boeing 737-800	3	2015	2021	Boeing 737-800	XY-ALC, XY-ALG and XY-ALF are sold due to budget insufficiency in 2021.
Embraer E190	2	2014	2019	None	Written off after nose landing gear failed to deploy in Mandalay International Airport.And Scrapped.
Embraer E190	2	2014	2022	None	Leased back to GE Capital Aviation Services.
Cessna Grand Caravan	2	2015	2016	None	XY-AMC crashes in Manaung Airport in 16 November 2016.
Cessna Grand Caravan	2	2015	2018	None	XY-AMB crashes in Mawlamyine Airport in 27 November 2018.

== Services ==
=== Mingalarbar Service ===
The service is complimentary for Business Class passengers, and to Premium Economy and Economy passengers for an extra fee. Services include amenities such as Fast Track Immigration and Security, assistance on arrival, limo service to and from Yangon International Airport, priority check-in and access to Mingalabar lounges in both the international and domestic terminals of Yangon International Airport.

=== Cabin ===
Myanmar National Airlines has been introducing new cabin interiors and in-flight entertainment since June 2015 on their new fleet of Boeing 737-800 and ATR 72-600 aircraft.

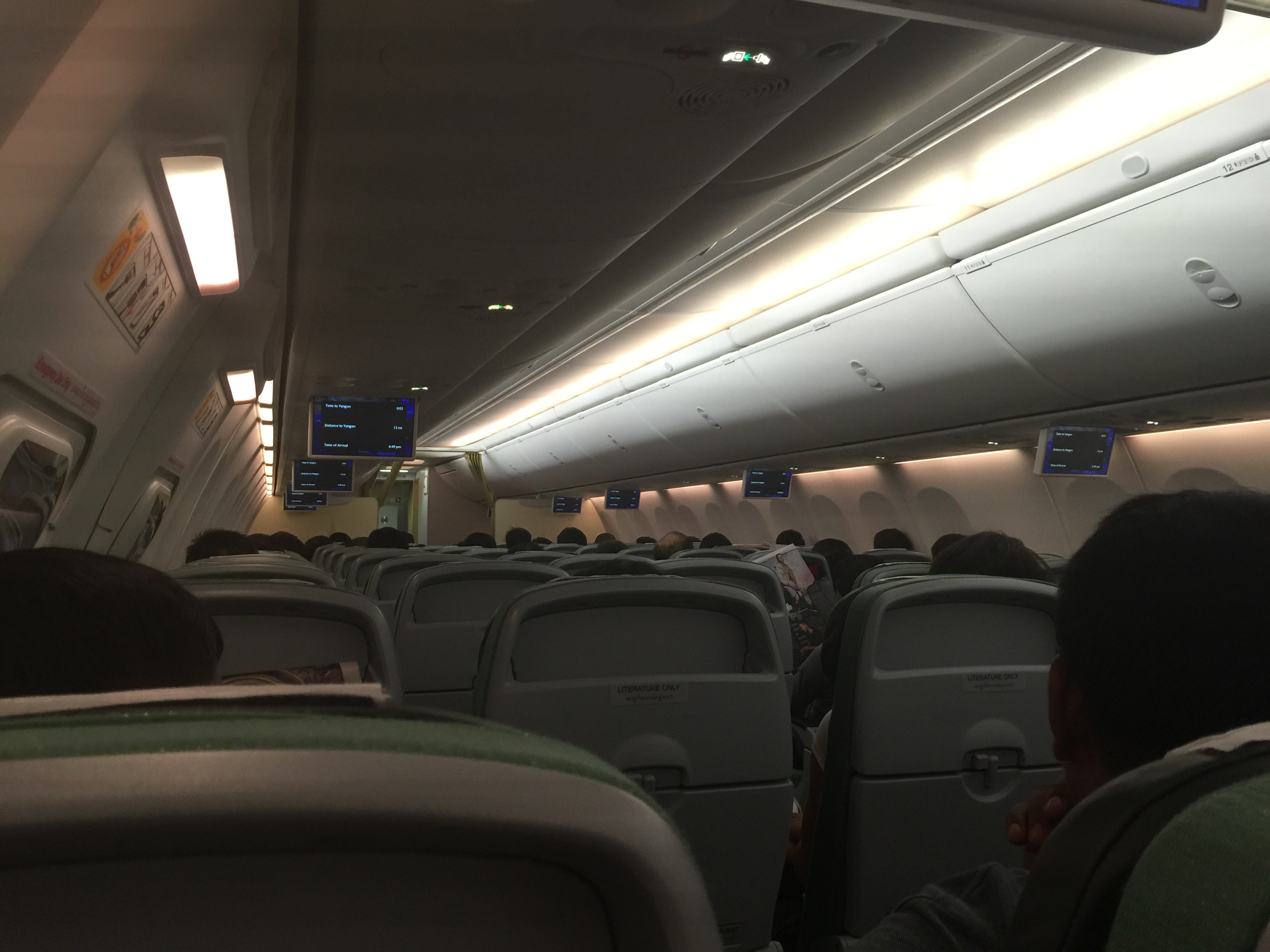
Myanmar National Airlines Boeing 737-800 cabin

==== Business class ====
Business Class is only available on the new Boeing 737-800 aircraft. The Business Class seats have 21 in (53 cm) width and recline to 42 in (107 cm) of pitch and feature electrical outlet and leg rest. A 9 in (23 cm) PTV is located in the seatrest offers AVOD.

==== Premium Economy class ====
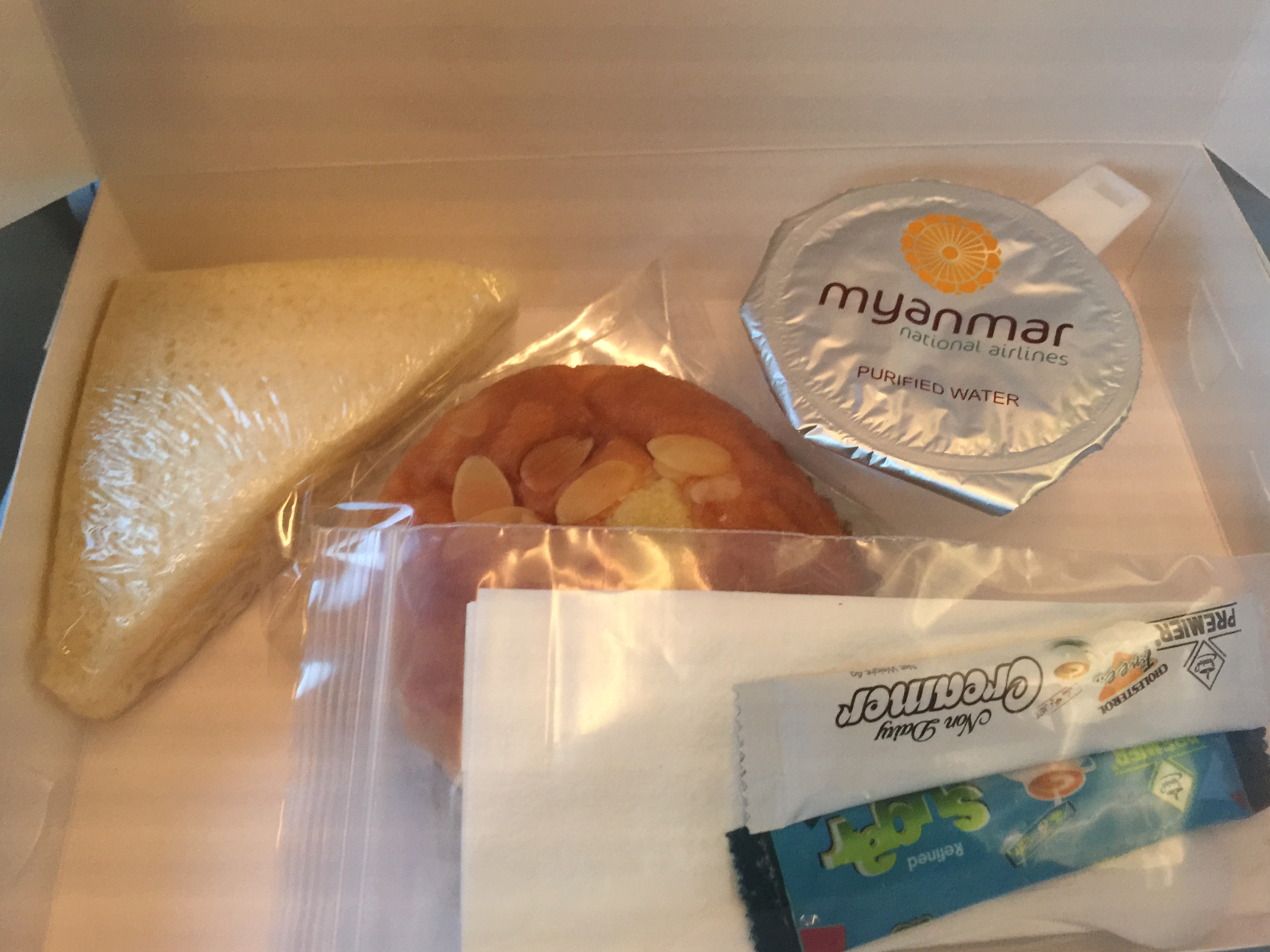
Premium Economy meal on board a domestic flight

Premium Economy was once available on the Embraer 190 and Boeing 737-800 aircraft but currently unavailable result of the airline decision to lease back all aircraft containing the Premium Economy seats. The Premium Economy seating features a 36-inch seat pitch, providing an additional four inches compared to Economy Class, along with a more significant recline but the in-seat power outlets and streaming inflight entertainment are only offered on the Boeing 737-800 aircraft.

==== Economy class ====
Economy class is offered on all of MNA's aircraft. The Economy Class seats are 17.2 in (44 cm) in width on the Boeing 737-800 and 18 in (46 cm) on Embraer 190 aircraft with 32 in (81 cm) of pitch, while the ATR 72-600 and Cessna 208 Caravan offer 17 in (43 cm) in width and a seat pitch between 30 and 32 inches. In-seat power outlet and streaming inflight entertainment is offered only on the Boeing 737-800 aircraft.

=== Inflight entertainment ===
Myanmar National Airlines offers streaming in-flight entertainment called airstream^{UB} on its Boeing 737-800 aircraft. Passengers will be able to watch movies, TV shows and listen to music via in-seat monitors or on their own smartphone, tablet (iOS or Android), or laptop over a wireless connection on board the aircraft. airstream^{UB} is available free of charge. Customers travelling in business class also have the option to access airstream^{UB} on the in arm monitor fitted in their seat. There are inflight magazines on board the Boeing 737-800 and the ATR 72-600.

== Accidents and incidents ==
=== Union of Burma Airways ===
- On 14 March 1949, de Havilland DH.104 Dove 1, registration XY-ABO, crashed in Gulf of Mottama (Martaban) en route from Mingaladon Airport to Moulmein (Mawlamyine) Airport. Nine passengers and two crew (Capt. P H Sparrow, pilot and L.A. Stephens, radio officer) died.
- On 26 June 1954, Douglas DC-3 was hijacked by members of the Karen National Defense Organization (KNDO, later the Karen National Liberation Army). After the killing of Saw Ba U Gyi in 1950, the first president of the Karen National Union (KNU), the group sought to regain both a political initiative and financial leverage. Three KNDO members - Major Saw Kyaw Aye, Captain Thein Kyaw and Captain A Nyein - planned to hijack a plane and use it to smuggle illegal weapons. They successfully hijacked the plane, and forced its British pilot Captain A.E. Hare to land on a deserted beach, after other group members had failed to build a suitable temporary runway in Karen. Finding 700,000 Burmese kyat in metal chests in the cargo, cash being transported between bank branches, they confiscated this and then let the plane take off. Censorship banned reporting of the story for over 50 years, but in April 2014 it was the subject of the book The World's First Hijacking, and is being developed into a Hollywood-produced film under the same title.
- On 2 September 1955, Douglas C-47A XY-ACQ struck Mount Popa (28 miles east of Lanywa) en route from Meitkila to Lanywa, killing all nine on board.
- On 8 August 1956, Douglas C-47B XY-ADC struck Mount Pindaya (near Thazi), killing 11 of 22 on board.
- On 10 June 1963, Douglas C-47A XY-ACS struck Mount Kaolokung, China, killing all 20 on board.
- On 23 May 1969, Douglas DC-3 XY-ACR crashed on approach to Lashio Airport following a loss of control, killing all six people on board. The aircraft was operating a domestic non-scheduled passenger flight.
- On 16 August 1972, a Douglas C-47B, registration XY-ACM, crashed shortly after take-off from Thandwe Airport on a scheduled passenger flight. Twenty-eight people on board were killed and only three survived.
- On 24 August 1972, Vickers Viscount 761D XY-ADF was damaged beyond economic repair at Sittwe Airport when it departed the runway on landing and the undercarriage collapsed. All 43 on board survived.

=== Burma Airways ===
- On 8 September 1977, de Havilland Canada Twin Otter 300 XY-AEH crashed into Mount Loi Hsam Hsao, killing all 25 on board.
- On 25 March 1978, Fokker F-27 Friendship 200 XY-ADK lost height and crashed into a paddy field just after takeoff from Mingaladon Airport, killing all 48 people on board.
- On 21 June 1987, a Burma Airways Fokker F-27 Friendship 200 slammed into an 8200 feet mountain 15 minutes after takeoff from Heho Airport, killing all 45 people on board.
- 11 October 1987, a Burma Airways Fokker F-27 Friendship 500 crashed into a 1,500 feet high mountain, killing all 49 people on board. This was Myanmar's second-deadliest air disaster, surpassed only by the crash of a Myanmar Air Force Shaanxi Y-8 in 2017, which killed 122 people. 36 foreigners—14 Americans, seven Swiss citizens, five Britons, four Australians, three West Germans, two French citizens and one Thai—were among the dead.

=== Myanma Airways ===
- On 24 August 1998, Myanma Airways Flight 635, a Fokker F27, crashed into a hill on approach to Tachilek Airport, killing all 36 on board.
- On 6 June 2009, Myanma Airways Flight 409, a Fokker F28 registration XY-ADW, overran the runway at Sittwe Airport. The aircraft was damaged beyond repair.

=== Myanmar National Airlines ===
- On 30 September 2022, amid the Myanmar civil war, a bullet launched from the ground penetrated the fuselage of a Myanmar National Airlines ATR 72 aircraft as it was landing in Loikaw Airport. Among the 63 passengers on board, the only injury was to a 27-year-old male passenger, whose right cheek was struck by the bullet and received medical attention upon landing. The State Administration Council accused the People's Defence Force and Karenni National Progressive Party for shooting the aircraft, but the latter denied responsibility for the incident.

== See also ==
- List of airlines of Burma
