= Myanma Airways Flight 635 =

1998 aviation accident

Coordinates: 20°31′15″N 99°53′54″E

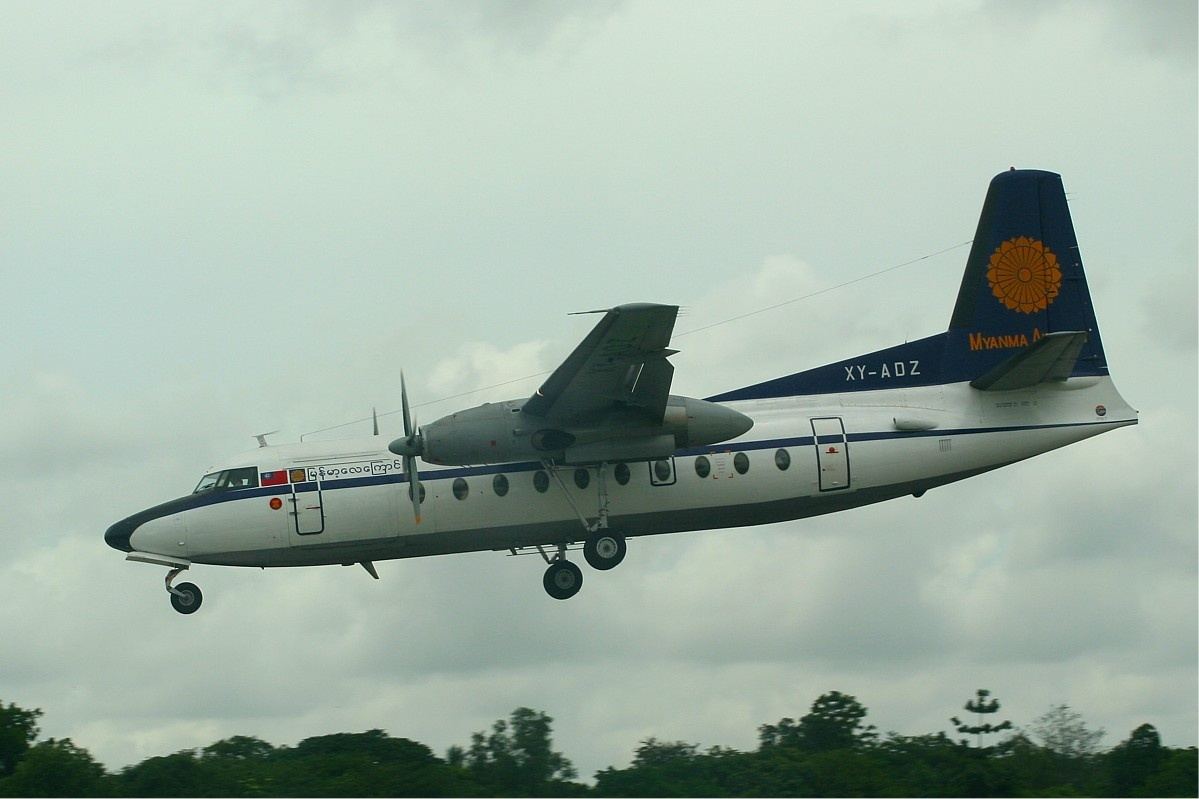
- A Myanmar Airways Fokker F-27 similar to the one involved.

Accident
- Date: 24 August 1998
- Summary: Controlled flight into terrain
- Site: near Tachilek, Myanmar (Burma)

Aircraft
- Aircraft type: Fokker F-27 Friendship
- Operator: Myanma Airways
- Registration: XY-AEN
- Flight origin: Yangon International Airport, Yangon, Myanmar (Burma)
- Destination: Tachilek Airport, Tachilek, Myanmar (Burma)
- Occupants: 36
- Passengers: 32
- Crew: 4
- Fatalities: 36
- Survivors: 0

Myanma Airways Flight 635 was a scheduled domestic passenger flight from Yangon to Tachileik in eastern Myanmar that was operated by a Fokker F-27 Friendship (registration XY-AEN) owned by Myanmar's flag carrier Myanma Airways. On 24 August 1998, during its descent to Tachileik the flight went missing over a hill approximately two miles (3.2 km) from the airport. The search and rescue team later found the wreckage of the aircraft. The accident killed all 36 passengers and crew.

== Flight ==
Flight UB635 took off at around 08:30 UTC, flying from Myanmar's former capital Yangon to Tachileik, a town located near the Myanmar-Thailand border in eastern Myanmar with 36 passengers and crew members. The passengers were mostly members of the Myanmar military. It was a two-hour flight and it was scheduled to land in Tachilek Airport at 02:00 UTC. The flight however missed its schedule and was declared missing by authorities.

=== Search and rescue operation ===
Myanmar officials contacted Thai authorities to assist with the search operation of the flight. Thailand's aide to the army chief Col. Nipat Thonglek stated that the crew members had at least twice contacted the airport for poor visibility during their descent to the airport. The flight might have been diverted to nearby Heho Airport in Myanmar or Chiang Mai Airport in Thailand, but officials from both airports claimed that neither of them had heard or seen any signs from the aircraft. Workers from Bangkok International Airport also stated that there were no signs that the aircraft had entered Thai airspace and no emergency calls were received by the operators.

On 25 August, a Myanmar official stated that Flight 635 had landed safely at an old airfield in Laos. He added that the passengers and crews were "OK" and that the aircraft was able to be flown back to Yangon by the next day.

However, on 27 August, the Laos Foreign Ministry denied the reports made by Myanmar officials two days earlier that the plane had landed safely in northern Laos. Myanmar's Foreign Ministry stated that the search was resumed. Later that day, Myanmar officials announced that they had been informed by the Laotian government that the aircraft had crashed in northern Laos, with no details provided on the fate of the passengers and crews.

On 28 August, Myanmar officials retracted their statement that the aircraft had crashed in northern Laos, stating that the aircraft had crashed in Myanmar's territory. The wreckage was found by search party at 02:00 a.m local time, in a mountainous and densely forested area. Government officials announced that all 36 bodies had been found. Everyone on board, including 4 crew members and 3 babies, were killed in the crash.

=== Controversy ===
A news report from Bangkok Post stated that several people had actually survived the crash, but were eventually killed by local villagers. The paper quoted unnamed officials and witnesses from the crash site, stating that an air stewardess and a female university student were gang-raped, while the male survivors, who were military personnel, were tortured and killed by the ethnic Shan villagers. An infant was reportedly starved to death. Myanmar authorities stated that at least 14 Shan villagers had been questioned for the incident.

== Passengers and crews ==
Government officials initially stated that there were 39 passengers and crew members on board the flight. It was later revised to 36 passengers and crew members, including 3 infants. Most of those on board were members of the Myanmar military and their family members. Myanmar authorities stated that all on board were from Myanmar. Among the passengers were the Tachileik police chief and senior officials from Tachileik.
