= Ann Airport =

Airport in Myanmar

- IATA: VBA; ICAO: VYAN

Summary
- Location: Ann, Myanmar
- Time zone: Myanmar Standard Time (+6:30)
- Elevation AMSL: 74 ft / 23 m
- Coordinates: 19°46′08″N 094°01′34″E

Map

Runways
| Direction | Length | | Surface |
| Direction | ft | m | Surface |
|---|---|---|---|
| 18/36 | 8,500 | 2,591 | Concrete |

Ann Airport (IATA: VBA, ICAO: VYAN) is an airport located at Ann, Rakhine State of Myanmar. It is currently occupied by the Arakan Army, an insurgent group against the ruling Myanmar junta.

== Airlines and destinations ==
| Airlines | Destinations |
|---|---|
| Myanmar National Airlines | Magway, Yangon |
