= Loikaw Airport =

Coordinates: 19°41′29″N 097°12′53″E

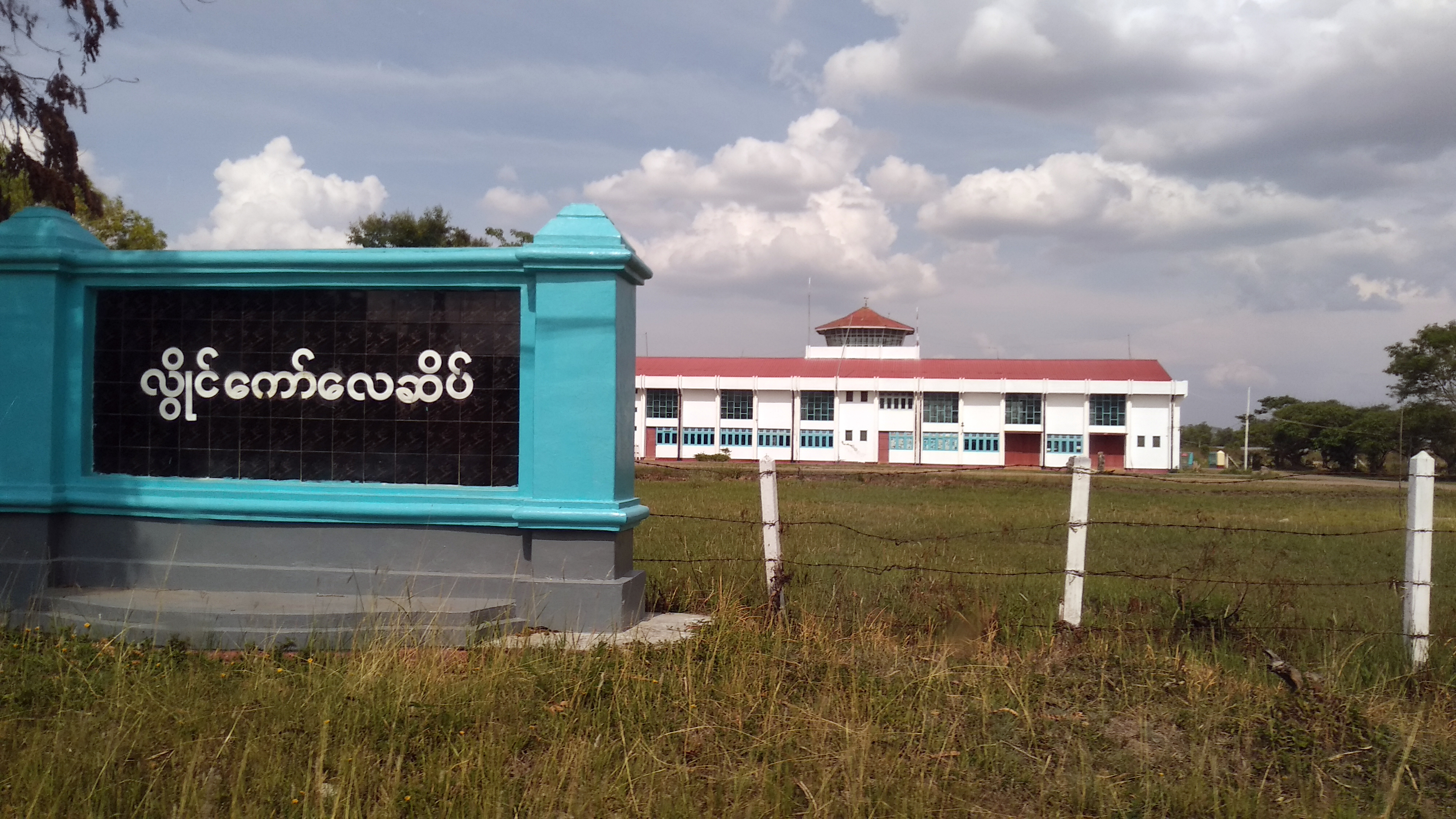

- IATA: LIW; ICAO: VYLK Location within Myanmar

Summary
- Airport type: Public
- Operator: Government
- Location: Loikaw, Myanmar
- Elevation AMSL: 2,940 ft / 896 m
- Interactive map of Loikaw Airport

Runways
Direction	Length		Surface
Direction	ft	m	Surface
01/19	7,002	2,134	Bitumen

Loikaw Airport (IATA: LIW, ICAO: VYLK) is an airport in Loikaw, Myanmar. It is the only Airport in Kayah State. The airport is 2 km North-East of Loikaw with a runway measuring 7002 ft × 100 ft. On 30 September 2022, a bullet launched from the ground hit an ATR 72 operated by Myanmar National Airlines, during its descent into Loikaw Airport at Runway 19. The injury was to a 27-year-old person, whose right cheek was hit by the bullet, after the it went through the fuselage. The bullet continued to the overhead compartment. The plane went out of service due to the damage to the exterior and the interior.

== Airlines and destinations ==
Airlines	Destinations
Air Thanlwin	Mandalay, Yangon
Mann Yatanarpon Airlines	Heho, Yangon
Mingalar Aviation Services	Heho, Yangon
Myanmar Airways International	Heho, Yangon
Myanmar National Airlines	Mandalay, Nay Pyi Taw, Yangon
