= Magway Airport =

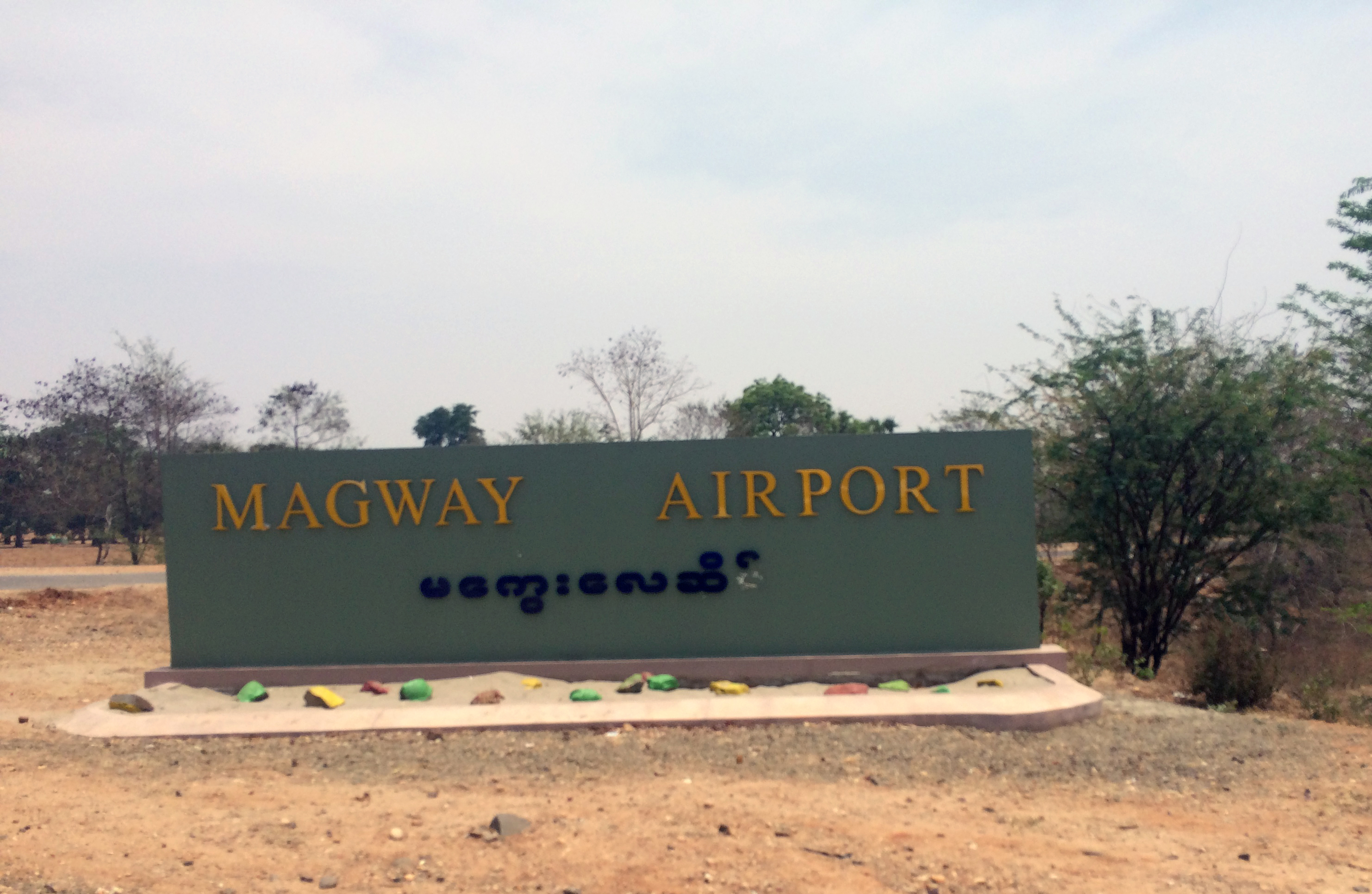
- IATA: MWQ; ICAO: VYMW

Summary
- Location: Magway, Myanmar
- Elevation AMSL: 298 ft / 91 m
- Coordinates: 20°9′28″N 94°58′22″E

Map

Runways
Direction	Length		Surface
Direction	ft	m	Surface
01/19	8,530	2,600	Concrete

Magway Airport is an airport in Magway, in central Myanmar. Analysis of Google Earth imagery confirms it is also the base for several types of fighter aircraft belonging to the Myanmar Air Force.

Two jets from Magway Air Base crashed in adverse weather conditions on 16 October 2018, killing the pilots and a civilian on the ground.

The airport had been an Allied air base during the Second World War (known as Magwe).

== Airlines and destinations ==
Airlines	Destinations
Myanmar National Airlines	Ann, Yangon
