= Lashio Airport =

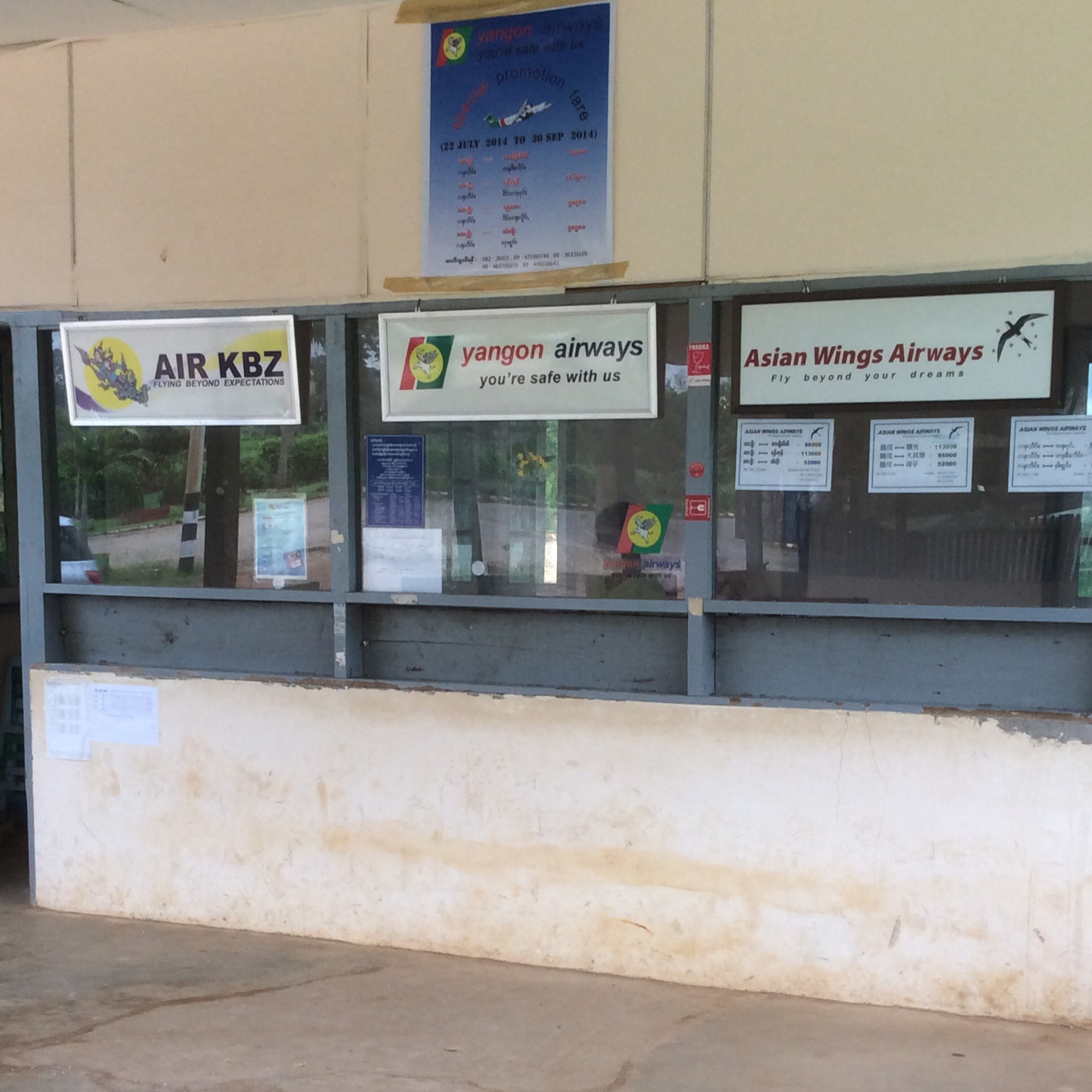
- Lashio airport checkin counter
- IATA: LSH; ICAO: VYLS

Summary
- Location: Lashio, Myanmar
- Elevation AMSL: 2,516 ft / 767 m
- Coordinates: 22°58′33″N 097°45′09″E

Map
- Location of airport in Myanmar

Runways
Direction	Length		Surface
Direction	ft	m	Surface
01/19	5,285	1,611	Bitumen

Lashio Airport (IATA: LSH, ICAO: VYLS) is an airport in Lashio, Myanmar. It is near the former headquarters of Northeast Military Command. On 30 July 2024 the airport was captured by the Myanmar National Democratic Alliance Army.

== Airlines and destinations ==
Airlines	Destinations
Mingalar Aviation Services	Heho, Yangon

== Accidents and incident ==
- On 23 May 1969, Douglas DC-3 XY-ACR of Union of Burma Airways crashed on approach to Lashio Airport, killing all six people on board. The aircraft was operating a domestic non-scheduled passenger flight.
