= Mawlamyine Airport =

Airport

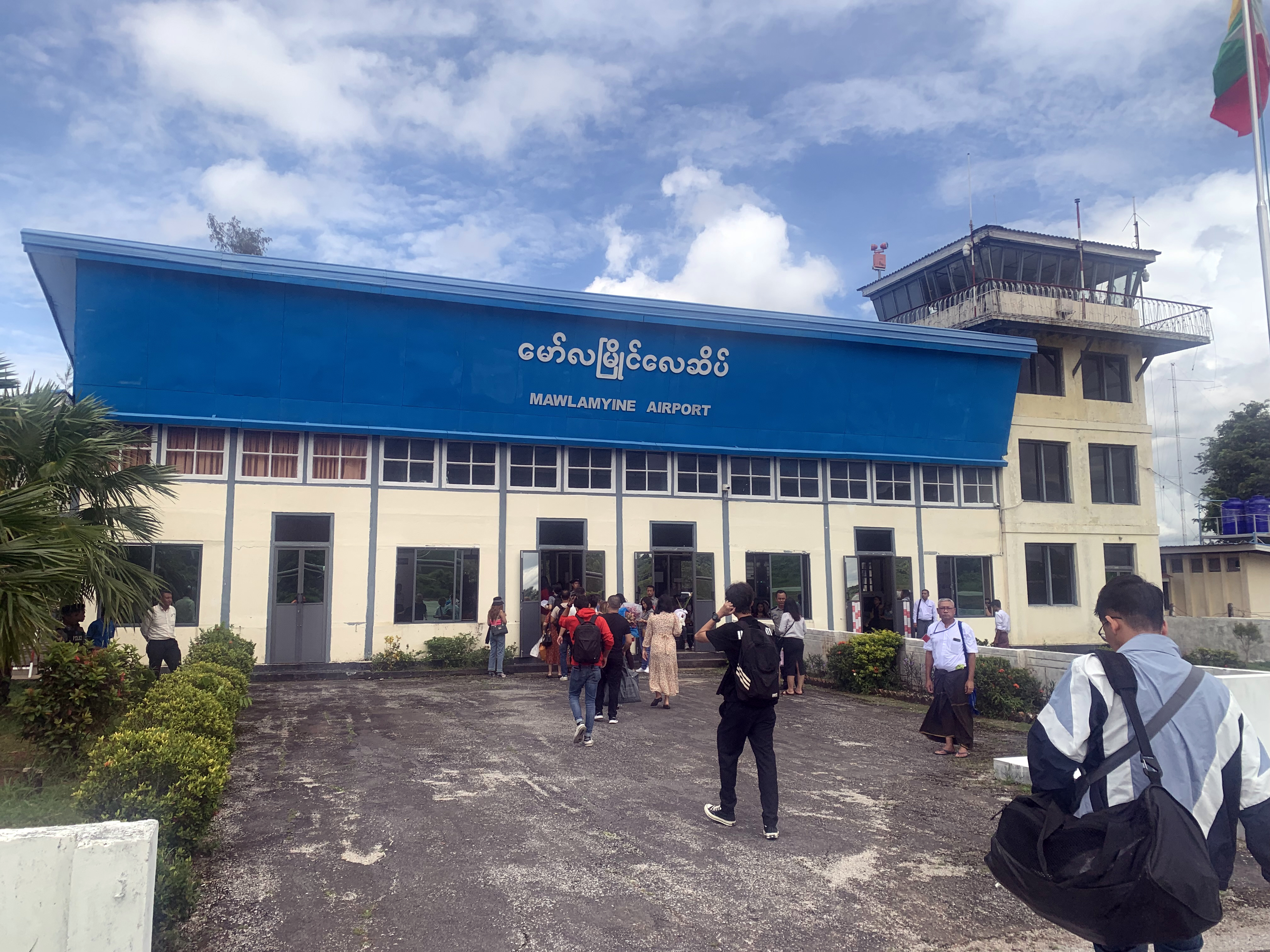
- IATA: MNU; ICAO: VYMM

Summary
- Airport type: Public
- Serves: Mawlamyine
- Location: Mawlamyine, Myanmar
- Elevation AMSL: 23.8 m (78 ft)
- Coordinates: 16°26′41.09″N 97°39′38.41″E

Map
- Location of airport in Myanmar

Runways
Direction	Length		Surface
Direction	m	ft	Surface
04/22	1,603	5,260	Asphalt

Mawlamyine Airport (formerly Moulmein Airport) is an airport in Mawlamyine (Moulmein), Myanmar (IATA: MNU, ICAO: VYMM).

== History ==
Mawlamyine (Moulmein) Airport was initially established in 1941. During World War II, it was a Royal Air Force field. It was used not only by the British but also by the Flying Tigers, an American volunteer pilot group then.

On 20 January 1942, as a major air operation in Southeast Asia, the 62nd Sentai Heavy Bombers escorted by the 50th Sentai of Imperial Japanese Army Air Service attacked the airfield and its satellite at Mudon with a total of 65 planes. On 28 February 1942, Japanese General Obata visited the airfield and it was reconstructed with 450 Japanese construction crews to be used as Air Force headquarters for attacking British airfield at Mingaladon.

After Burma's independence in 1948, the Union of Burma Airways (UBA) was founded and started its domestic services to local airports including Mawlamyine (Moulmein) Airport.

On 14 March 1949, a De Havilland DH.104 Dove 1 of the Union of Burma Airways, registration XY-ABO, crashed in Gulf of Mottama (Martaban) en route from Mingaladon Airport to Mawlamyine (Moulmein) Airport. Nine passengers and two crew (Captain P.H. Sparrow, pilot, and L.A. Stephens, radio officer) were lost. It was probably the first ever civilian plane crash in Burma's aviation history.

In September 2013, Nok Air Mini started flights between the Thai border town Mae Sot and Mawlamyine. This was the first time the airport handled international flights after 1948. However, Nok Air Mini stopped its service due to the poor condition of the runway and facilities.

== Modernisation ==
The Mawlamyine Airport's runway is being upgraded in the 2018 budget year. A total of MMK 114 million will be spent to upgrade the runway.

== Airlines and destinations ==
Airlines	Destinations
Air Thanlwin	Yangon
Myanmar National Airlines	Yangon

== In popular culture ==
Mawlamyine Airport was the location for a famous 1977 Burmese epic romance film Tein Oo Lay Pyay Maung Ko Say (Burmese: တိမ်ဦးလေပြေမောင့်ကိုစေ), starring Win Oo and Khin Yu May.
