= Hanthawaddy International Airport =

Future airport in Yangon, Myanmar

Coordinates: 17.302916°N 96.428353°E

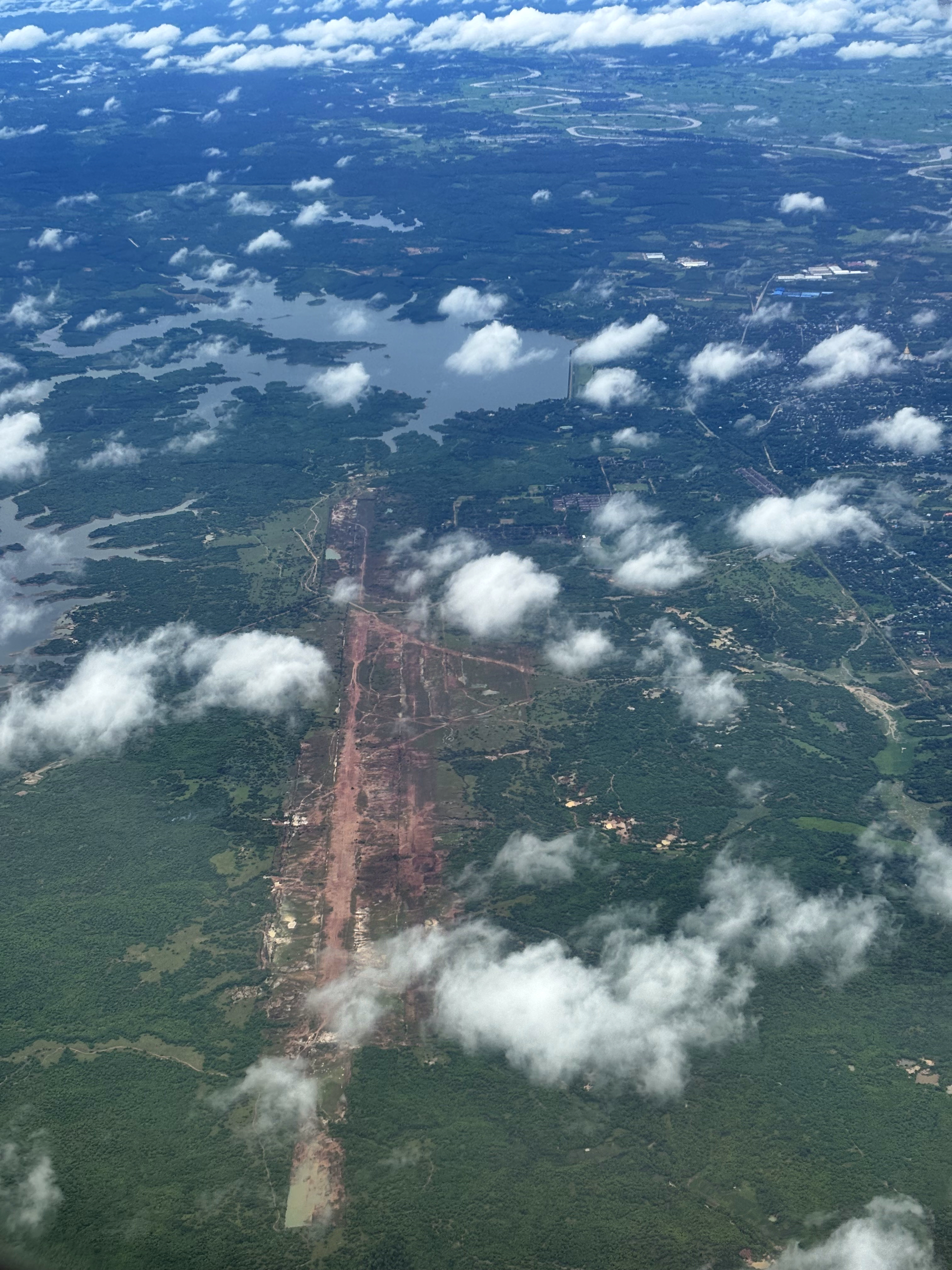
Aerial view of Hanthawaddy International Airport Project

Hanthawaddy International Airport (Burmese: ဟံသာဝတီအပြည်ပြည်ဆိုင်ရာလေဆိပ်) is an international airport currently under construction in Bago Region, Myanmar that is located about 48 miles (77 km) away from Yangon. The project was started in 2001 but it was subsequently halted. The proposed site of the airport has a gross area of 36.42 square kilometres (14.06 sq mi).

Myanmar's government has announced its plan to restart the project in 2012 to meet its future development. A consortium led by Incheon International Airport Corporation (IIAC), including South Korean firms (Halla Engineering & Construction Corporation, Lotte Engineering & Construction Corporation, POSCO ICT and Kumho Industrial Company) was awarded the US$1.1 billion contract, to build the new airport and operate the airport for 50 years. The airport will have the capacity to handle 12 million passengers per year and is expected to start operation by 2018.

Due to financial related issue and disagreement over passenger capacity, however, the deal with the Incheon consortium was terminated, and a new tender was reopened in February 2014.

The new tender was awarded to a Singapore-Japan consortium on 29 October 2014. The consortium comprises Singapore's Yongnam Holdings, Changi Airport Planners and Engineers, a subsidiary of Changi Airport Group, and Japan's JGC Corporation. The contract is worth $1.45 billion, and the consortium will get official development assistance from the Japanese government for up to 49 percent of the total contract. The rest of the funding will come from private lending ($517 million) and investments from the consortium ($222 million).

With the latest tenders and by a new operator, the completion date of Phase 1 is now pushed back to 2027. Phase 1 consists of a 3600m concrete runway, as well as the high-speed taxiway. After the Phase 3 completion around 2032-2035, Hanthawaddy will have "2" 3600m runways and a huge satellite terminal which has a capacity of 60million passengers per year ( can be updated ).

== See also ==
- Yangon International Airport
- Naypyidaw Airport
- Mandalay International Airport
