= Manaung Airport =

Airport in Myanmar

Manaung (Samonte) Airport
- IATA: MGU; ICAO: VYMN

Summary
- Location: Manaung, Rakhine State, Myanmar
- Elevation AMSL: 102 ft / 31 m
- Coordinates: 18°50′46″N 093°40′58″E

Map
- Location of airport in Myanmar

Runways
Direction	Length		Surface
Direction	ft	m	Surface
16/34	4,000	1,219	Bitumen

Manaung Airport (IATA: MGU, ICAO: VYMN) is an airport in Manaung, Rakhine State, Myanmar. Manaung Airport was constructed in 1969 for Douglas C-47 Skytrain airplanes as a grass landing airstrip. In the 1983-1984 fiscal year, it was upgraded to be all-weather accessible with a 2,000 ft long bituminous airstrip for Twin Otter type aircraft. In 2015, The length of the airstrip was then expanded to 4,000 ft for F-27 Fokker aircraft, with only 3,700 ft of the airstrip being upgraded to asphalt concrete surface.

Following the 2021 military coup, commercial air flights to Manaung airports were suspended and did not resume until April 24, 2026. Operations were restarted using small L-410 aircraft.

== Airlines and destinations ==
Airlines	Destinations
Myanmar National Airlines	Yangon
