= Surbung Airport =

Airport in Chin State, Myanmar

- IATA: SRU; ICAO: VYFS

Summary
- Airport type: Public
- Operator: Ministry of Transport and Communications
- Serves: Falam
- Location: Falam Township, Myanmar
- Elevation AMSL: 6,000 ft / 1,830 m
- Coordinates: 22°56′21″N 93°36′55″E

Map
- Location within Myanmar

Runways
Direction	Length		Surface
Direction	ft	m	Surface
	6,000	1,830	Asphalt
- source: skyvector.com

Surbung Airport (IATA: SRU, ICAO: VYFS) is a domestic airport located in Falam Township, Chin State of Myanmar. The airport is the first airport in Chin State and 69th airport of Myanmar. The airport is located west of Falam. It is at an elevation of 1,830 metres (6,000 ft) above mean sea level. It has one asphalt runway measuring 6,000 by 98 feet (1,829 m × 30 m).

Construction began in April 2015 with the budget of US$26 million.

== Airlines and destinations ==
Airlines	Destinations
Myanmar National Airlines	Mandalay
