= Monghsat Airport =

- IATA: MOG; ICAO: VYMS

Summary
- Airport type: Public
- Serves: Monghsat
- Location: Monghsat, Myanmar
- Elevation AMSL: 572 m / 1,875 ft
- Coordinates: 20°31′00″N 099°15′24″E

Map
- Location of airport in Myanmar

Runways
| Direction | Length | | Surface |
| Direction | m | ft | Surface |
|---|---|---|---|
| 12/30 | 1,524 | 5,000 | Asphalt |

Monghsat Airport is an airport in Monghsat, Myanmar (IATA: MOG, ICAO: VYMS). On average, it has 1 departure flight each day.

== Airlines and destinations ==
| Airlines | Destinations |
|---|---|
| Myanmar National Airlines | Heho |
