= Manaung =

Manaung မာန်အောင်
- Town
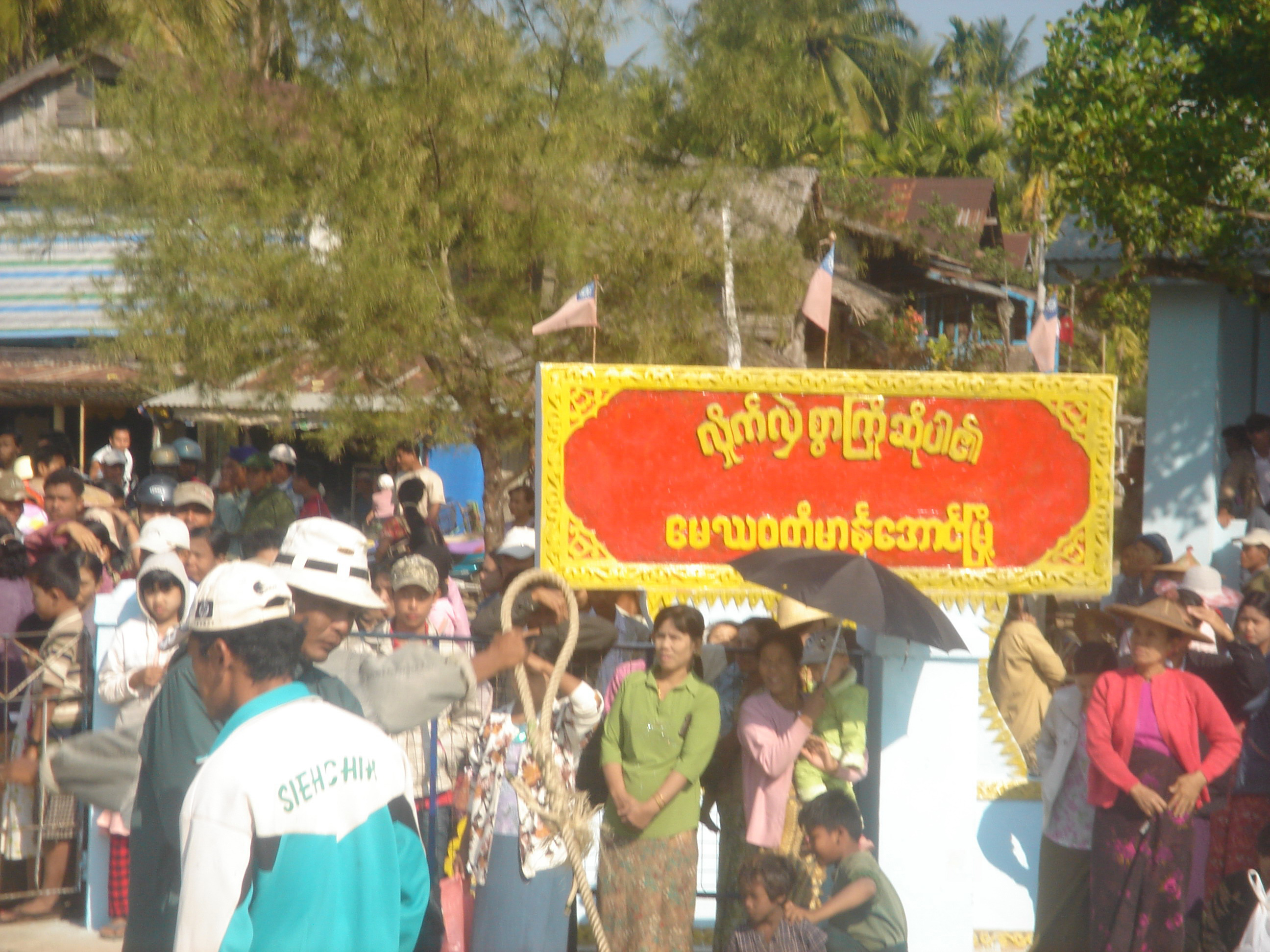

- Location in Bangladesh
- Coordinates: 18°51′N 93°44′E
- Country: Myanmar
- Division: Rakhine State
- District: Kyaukpyu District
- Township: Manaung Township

Population (2005)
  - Religions: Buddhism
- Time zone: UTC+6.30 (MST)

Manaung (Burmese: မာန်အောင်မြို့) is a town in Rakhine State, Myanmar (Burma) on Cheduba Island. It lies on the left bank of a river in the north-east of the island. The town is served by Manaung Airport.

== Climate ==
Climate data for Manaung (1991–2020)
Month	Jan	Feb	Mar	Apr	May	Jun	Jul	Aug	Sep	Oct	Nov	Dec	Year
Mean daily maximum °C (°F)	29.5 (85.1)	30.3 (86.5)	32.2 (90.0)	34.1 (93.4)	33.6 (92.5)	30.7 (87.3)	30.0 (86.0)	29.9 (85.8)	31.0 (87.8)	32.1 (89.8)	31.9 (89.4)	30.3 (86.5)	31.3 (88.3)
Daily mean °C (°F)	21.7 (71.1)	22.2 (72.0)	25.2 (77.4)	27.9 (82.2)	28.5 (83.3)	27.1 (80.8)	26.5 (79.7)	27.1 (80.8)	27.3 (81.1)	27.7 (81.9)	27.0 (80.6)	22.1 (71.8)	25.9 (78.6)
Mean daily minimum °C (°F)	14.0 (57.2)	14.0 (57.2)	18.2 (64.8)	21.7 (71.1)	23.4 (74.1)	23.6 (74.5)	23.1 (73.6)	24.3 (75.7)	23.7 (74.7)	23.2 (73.8)	22.1 (71.8)	13.9 (57.0)	20.4 (68.7)
Average precipitation mm (inches)	9.0 (0.35)	1.5 (0.06)	2.7 (0.11)	18.0 (0.71)	248.6 (9.79)	829.9 (32.67)	1,020.1 (40.16)	870.8 (34.28)	517.1 (20.36)	250.6 (9.87)	46.4 (1.83)	7.9 (0.31)	3,822.5 (150.49)
Average precipitation days (≥ 1.0 mm)	0.4	0.2	0.3	1.0	9.6	19.7	23.1	22.6	18.0	11.3	2.4	0.6	109.0
Source: World Meteorological Organization
