= Monywa Airport =

Airport

Monywa airport မုံရွာလေဆိပ်
- IATA: NYW; ICAO: VYMY

Summary
- Airport type: Public
- Owner: Government of the Republic of Union of Myanmar
- Operator: Department of Civil Aviation
- Serves: Monywa, Myanmar
- Location: Monywa, Myanmar
- Elevation AMSL: 91 m / 298 ft
- Coordinates: 22.14°N 95.07°E

Map
- Location of airport in Myanmar

Runways
Direction	Length		Surface
Direction	m	ft	Surface
18 / 36	2,591	8,501	Asphalt/concrete

Monywa Airport is an airport in Monywa, Sagaing Region, Myanmar.
