= Nay Pyi Taw International Airport =

Airport in Naypyidaw, Myanmar

Nay Pyi Taw International Airport နေပြည်တော် အပြည်ပြည်ဆိုင်ရာ လေဆိပ်
- IATA: NYT; ICAO: VYNT

Summary
- Airport type: Public
- Owner: Government of the Republic of the Union of Myanmar
- Operator: Ministry of Transport (Myanmar)
- Serves: Nay Pyi Taw Union Territory
- Location: Nay Pyi Taw, Myanmar
- Opened: 19 December 2011; 14 years ago
- Time zone: MST (UTC+06:30)
- Elevation AMSL: 109 ft (33 m)
- Coordinates: 19°36′54″N 96°12′46″E
- Website: Naypyidaw International Airport at the Wayback Machine (archived February 2, 2018)

Map
- Location of airport in Myanmar

Runways
Direction	Length		Surface
Direction	ft	m	Surface
16/34	12,000	3,657	Concrete

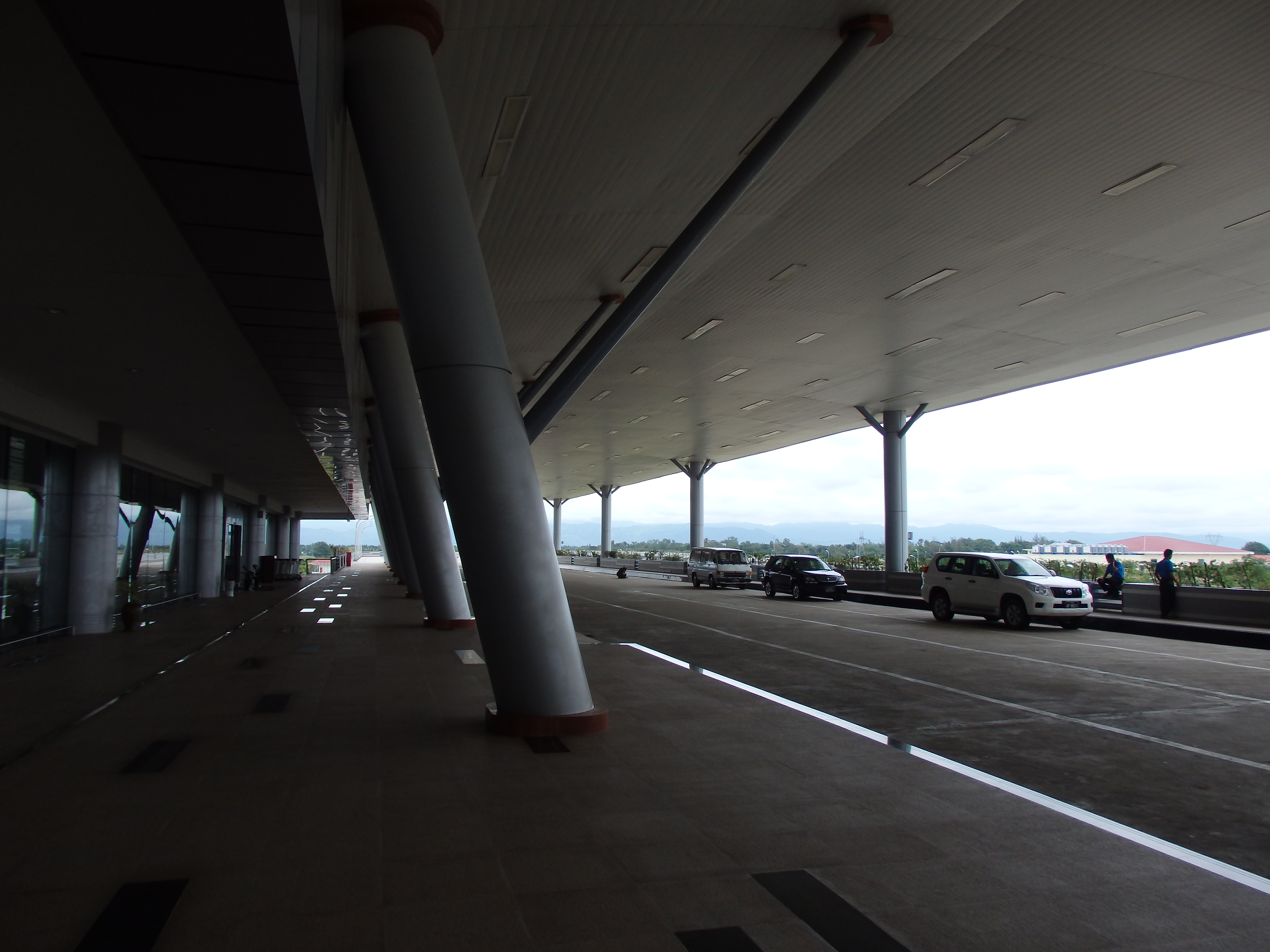
Naypyidaw airport

Naypyidaw International Airport, officially spelled Nay Pyi Taw (IATA: NYT, ICAO: VYNT), (Burmese: နေပြည်တော် အပြည်ပြည်ဆိုင်ရာ လေဆိပ်; previously known as Ela Airport), is located 16 kilometers (10 mi) southeast of Nay Pyi Taw, the capital of Myanmar. Before the foundation of Naypyidaw, it was known as the airport of the nearby town of Lewe. The airport officially opened on 19 December 2011. The airport's air traffic control tower collapsed during the 2025 Myanmar earthquake, killing six people.

== History ==
=== Construction ===
The airport was designed to eventually handle up to 3.5 million passengers annually. Nay Pyi Taw International Airport was designed by CPG Consultants Pte., Ltd. of Singapore. The company previously designed the annex to Yangon International Airport, as well as Singapore's Changi Airport and several airports in Vietnam and Laos. Building work, performed by Asia World Company, a Myanmar corporation, began in January 2009. The airport has the following features:

- An airport building that can handle 3.5 million passengers
- A taxiway that is 3700 meters long and 30.5 meters wide
- A 403 meter long and 336 meter wide apron (total area of 135,408 square meters) where 10 aircraft can park simultaneously
- Boarding bridges
- An annex to the airport
- Control tower
- Car parking
- Other facilities

Two million international passengers plus 1.5 million local passengers (total 3.5 million) can use the main airport building per year. It is made up of:

- the main hall, area 17,174 square meters
- the east and west halls, area 3,224 square meters each
- the north hall, area of 5,912 square meters

The total area of the ground, first and second floors of the building is 63,000 square meters.

=== 2025 earthquake ===
A runway, the airport and two aircraft were damaged when a violent earthquake struck Myanmar on 28 March 2025. The airport was temporarily closed as a result of the earthquake. The air traffic control tower collapsed, killing all of the six staff on duty. The airport along with Mandalay International Airport were reopened and local travel services were resumed on April 4 and 5.

== Expansion plans ==
Further expansions are planned, and at their completion, the airport will have two runways and three terminals with modern facilities. The next two phases are:

The second phase of the expansion project includes adding an apron measuring 1200 feet × 1200 feet in front of the already-constructed airport building, an apron where VIP aircraft park and building four more boarding bridges at the airport building for passengers, a flight catering building, a government complex and an airport maintenance base.

The third phase includes adding 17 more boarding bridges, a dual parallel taxiway measuring 1200 ft × 100 ft, a runway measuring 12000 ft × 100 ft in front of the airport building, a set of dual parallel taxiway measuring 12,000 ft × 100 ft, four taxiways measuring 650 ft × 100 ft, four taxiways measuring 550 ft × 100 ft and an apron for cargo planes. After the third phase is completed, the airport will be able to cope with 10.5 million passengers annually and it will be more modern and sophisticated than Yangon International Airport and Mandalay International Airport.

== Layout ==
The airport building is a two-story building with reinforced concrete bore piles. The ground floor is for passenger arrivals and the first floor for passenger departures. The west hall is for local passengers, the east hall and the north hall for international passengers.

The approach road to the airport with two ways / four lanes is 1500 meters long. The car parking measures 200 meters by 107 meters and its total area is 21,400 square meters. The 62-metre-high control tower can control all the construction tasks of the first, second and third phases of the project.

== Airlines and destinations ==
Although the airport is international in name, As of 2024 mainly national airlines service the airport, offering about 20 flights a month.

Airlines	Destinations
Air Thanlwin	Heho, Yangon
Mann Yadanarpon Airlines	Heho
Myanmar National Airlines	Heho, Loikaw, Mandalay, Sittwe, Yangon

Previously, international services were offered to Kunming and Bangkok. The total number of passengers at the airport in 2013 was about 100,000, of which three quarters were domestic passengers.

== See also ==
- List of structures and infrastructure affected by the 2025 Myanmar earthquake
