= Yangon International Airport =

Airport serving Yangon, Myanmar

Yangon International Airport ရန်ကုန်အပြည်ပြည်ဆိုင်ရာလေဆိပ်
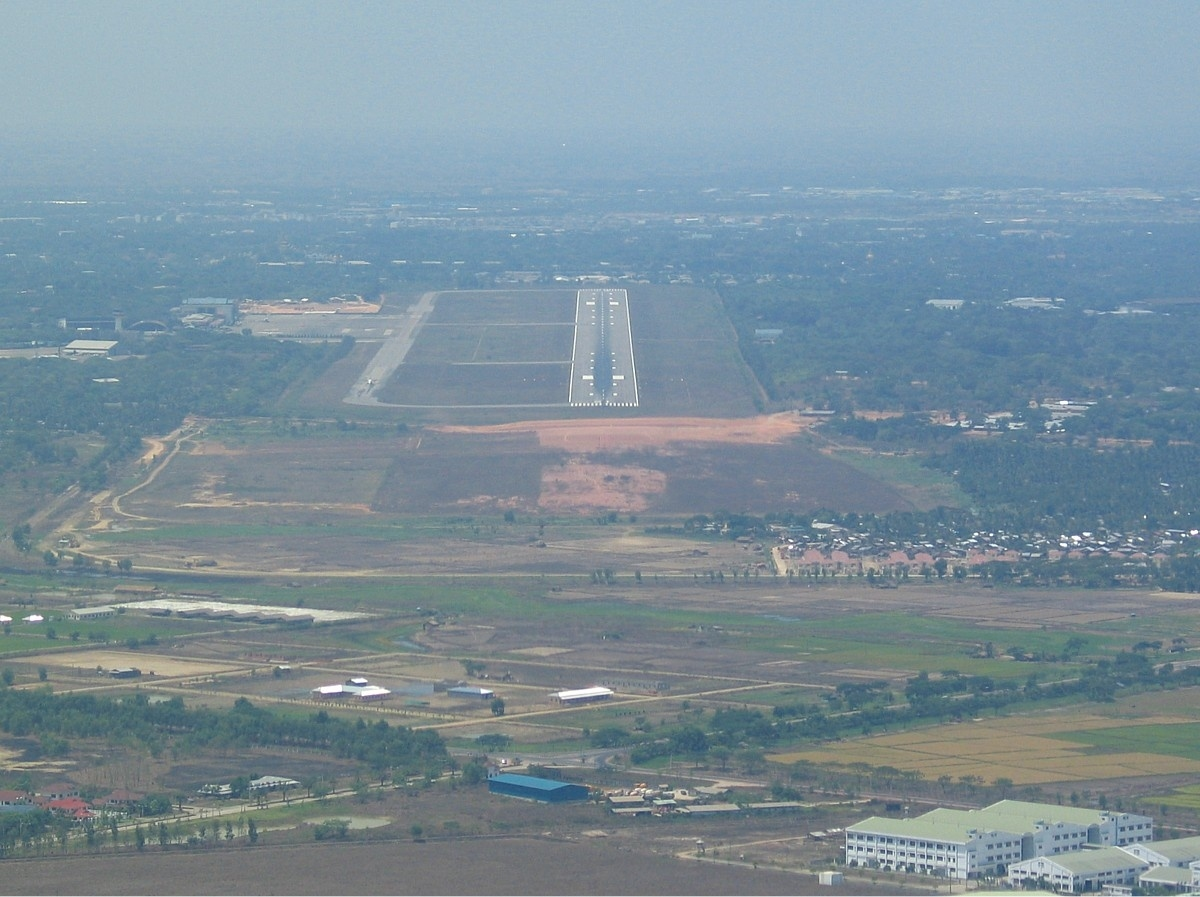
- Yangon Airport in 2004
- IATA: RGN; ICAO: VYYY

Summary
- Airport type: Public
- Owner: Government of the Republic of Union of Myanmar
- Operator: Yangon Aerodrome Co., Ltd
- Serves: Yangon
- Location: Mingaladon 11021, Yangon; Yangon Division, Myanmar
- Opened: 1947; 79 years ago
- Hub for: Mingalar Aviation Services; Air Thanlwin; Myanmar National Airlines; Myanmar Airways International
- Elevation AMSL: 109 ft (33 m)
- Coordinates: 16°54′26″N 96°07′59″E
- Website: yangonairport.aero

Maps
- Location of airport in Myanmar
- Interactive map of Yangon International Airport

Runways
Direction	Length		Surface
Direction	ft	m	Surface
03/21	11,201	3,414	Asphalt

Statistics (2018)
- Passengers: 6,104,854 ▲
- International passengers: 3,930,590 ▲
- Source: Yangon Aerodrome Co. Ltd.

Yangon International Airport (Burmese: ရန်ကုန်အပြည်ပြည်ဆိုင်ရာလေဆိပ်, MLCTS: rankun apranyprany hcuingra lehcip [jàɴɡòʊɰ̃ əpjìpjì sʰàɪɴjà lèzeɪʔ]) (IATA: RGN, ICAO: VYYY) is the primary and busiest international airport of Myanmar. The airport is located in Mingaladon township, 15 kilometres (9.3 mi) north of central Yangon. Many domestic Myanmar carriers and international airlines operate at Yangon International Airport. The airport is also colloquially known as Mingaladon Airport due to its location.

== History ==
=== As RAF Mingaladon ===
During World War II, the airfield was called RAF Mingaladon and served as an operating base for fighter aircraft such as:

- No. 60 Squadron RAF from February 1941 to February 1942 flying Bristol Blenheim I
- No. 67 Squadron RAF from October 1941 to March 1942 flying Brewster Buffalo and Hawker Hurricane IIs
- No. 135 Squadron RAF from January–February 1942 flying Hawker Hurricane IIs
- No. 681 Squadron RAF from June to September 1945 flying Supermarine Spitfire
- 3rd Squadron of 1st American Volunteer Group (Flying Tigers) of the Chinese Air Force flying Curtiss P-40s

Additional units based there were:

- Air Headquarters Burma Communication Squadron RAF
- Air Headquarters Burma Communication Flight RAF
- Air Headquarters Netherlands East Indies Communication Squadron RAF
- No. 221 Group Communication Squadron RAF

There was also a Communication Flight of the Burma Volunteer Air Force equipped with de Havilland Tiger Moths and Westland Lysanders and anti-aircraft support for the airfield was provided by members of the 12th Burma Rifles.

=== As Japanese airfield ===
During the Second World War, in 1941 the Japanese began their attack on Burma, including an air raid on Mingaladon. By 1942, the outnumbered Allied forces had retreated and the Japanese took over the airfield. Mingaladon was then used by the Japanese, and Japanese bombers based in Bangkok were moved forward to Mingaladon when there was a full moon. The British at the Wireless Experimental Centre in Delhi had decrypted BULBUL, the IJA air-to-ground code, and could predict Japanese air raids. On one occasion Allied nightfighters "got the lot and all night we could hear Mingaladon air base calling for its lost children".

=== Becoming Yangon Airport ===
After World War II, Yangon Airport was built on the site of the former RAF Mingaladon in 1947 by the Calcutta Metropolitan Airports Authority. Once regarded as the best in Southeast Asia and the primary airport serving that region, the airport fell into disrepair and remained that way for decades, as new super hubs like Singapore Changi Airport, Kuala Lumpur Sepang, Bangkok Suvarnabhumi and Jakarta Soekarno-Hatta were built and superseded Yangon's facilities.

In November 2012, Condor began flying seasonally to Frankfurt with Boeing 767s. The outbound flight from Yangon made a stop in Phuket, but the inbound one was direct. The airline cut the route at the end of the first season. Airport capacity was boosted to 6 million passengers per year in early 2016. Currently, there are plans to build a new, larger airport, Hanthawaddy International Airport, on a much larger site and somewhat away from Yangon.

== Modernisation ==
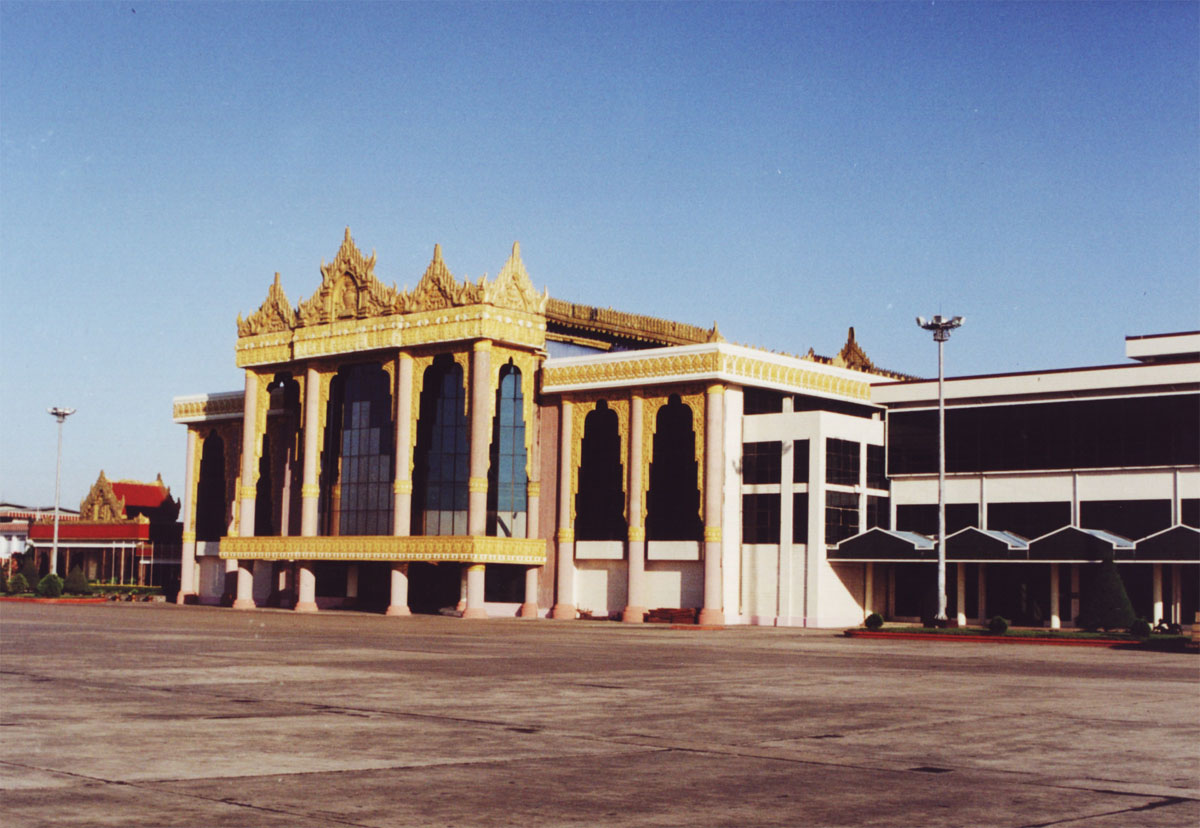
Terminal in 2002, before modernisation

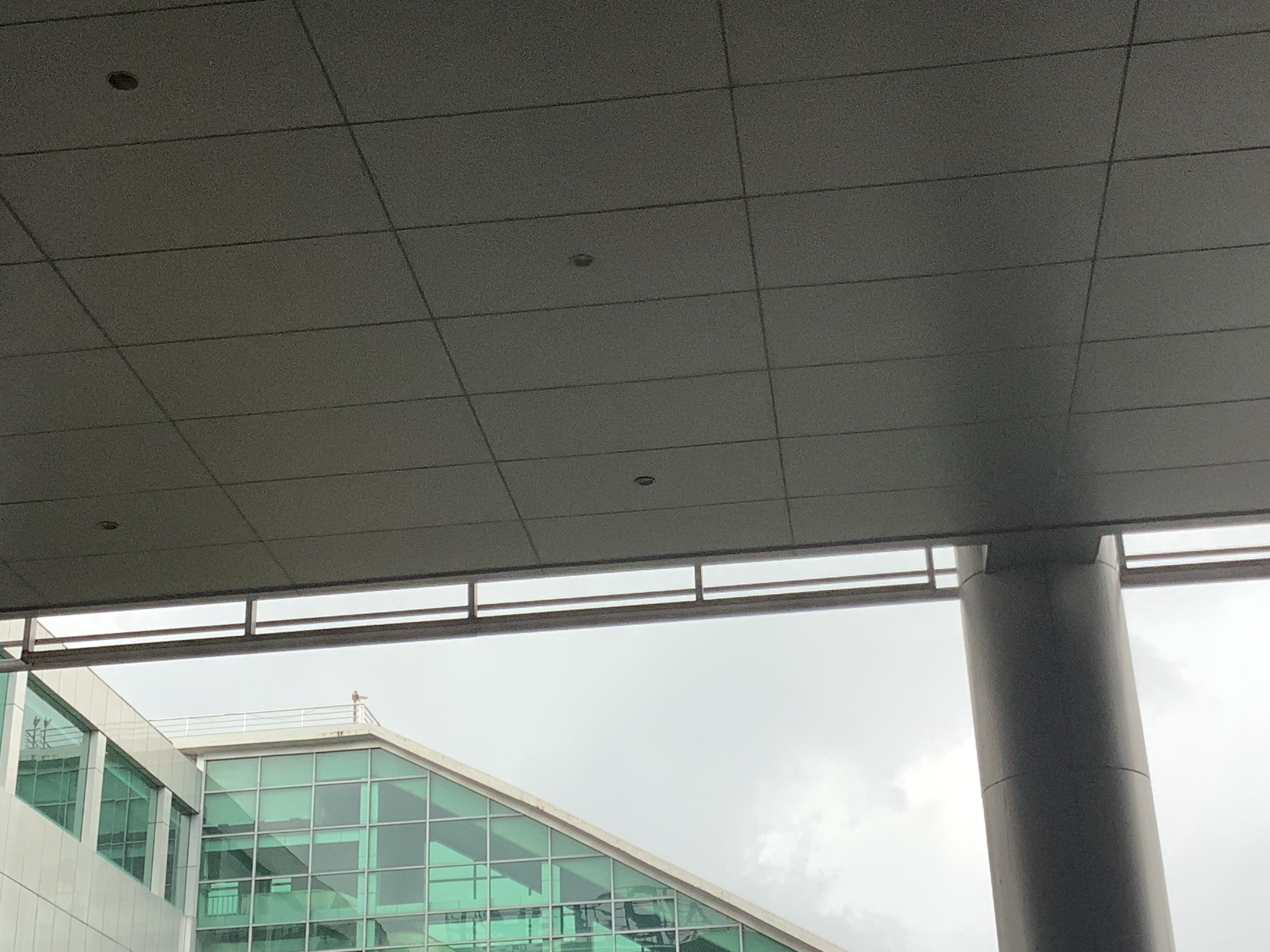
Yangon International Airport (exterior) 2024

A modernisation program was launched in April 2003 and resulted in a new terminal and an extended 3414 m runway.

Designed by the Airport Development Division of CPG Corporation of Singapore, a new terminal was constructed at a cost of US$13.3 million by Asia World. It can handle 900 arriving and 900 departing passengers simultaneously. The design meets IATA service standards and complies with ICAO safety and security standards at a cost of SG$30 million. Other notable features include:

- Separate floors for arriving and departing passengers to lessen congestion
- Automated baggage handling system with an integrated check-in system
- Four air bridges, capable of handling four Boeing 747s
- Special lounges for use by government officials and business people
- A two-story parking garage with spaces for 340 vehicles

In June 2011, the government announced plans to expand the airport by 40% and increase its capacity from 2.7 million passengers to 3.8 million passengers annually. The airport was already over its annual capacity of 2.7 million passengers, having accepted 3.1 million in 2012 and 4 million in 2014. To fulfill this increased demand, new international and domestic terminals are being constructed and are expected to be finished end of 2016. After upgrading, Yangon International Airport will be able to service 6 million passengers annually.

In 2013, a contract worth $150 million was awarded to a consortium led by an affiliate of Asia World to construct a new domestic terminal and expansion of airport apron.

The new international terminal (T1) opened in March 2016, with the previously existing international terminal being designated as T2. The new domestic terminal (T3) opened on 5 December 2016.

== Terminals ==
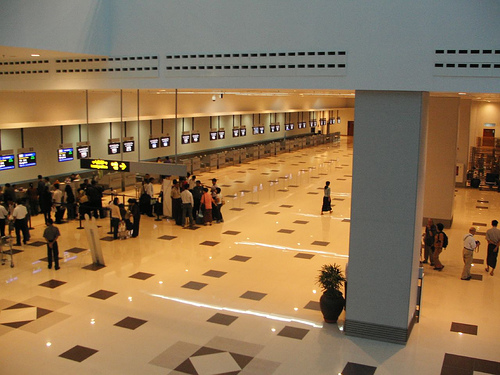
Check-in desks in Terminal 2

=== Terminal 1 ===
In August 2014, the old domestic terminal was demolished and construction began for the new six-story Terminal 1, which will handle international flights. The opening ceremony was held on 12 March 2016. After the opening of Terminal 1, the airport can handle 6 million passengers annually, as opposed to 2.7 million before.

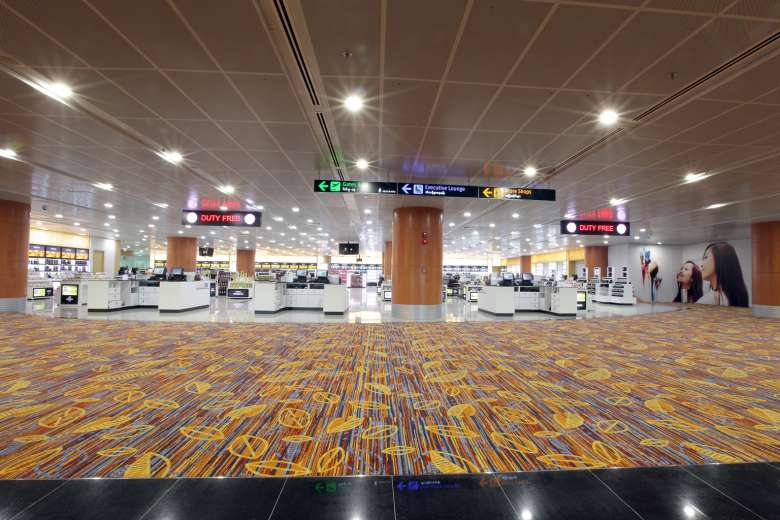
Terminal 1

=== Terminal 2 ===
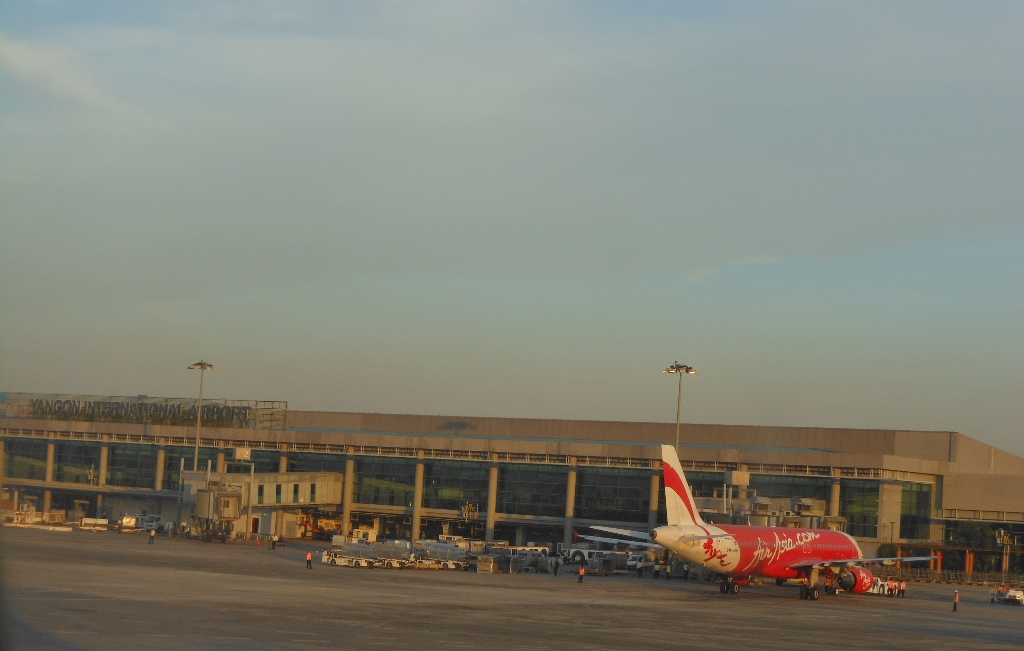
Terminal 2

After the opening of Terminal 1, the former International Terminal was renamed "Terminal 2." The building was designed by the CPG Corporation of Singapore and constructed by the Asia World Company costing US$13.3 million. The terminal can handle 900 arriving passengers and 900 departing passengers at the same time. Terminal 2 was closed in July 2018 to undergo extensive renovation. All international flights now operate from Terminal 1.

=== Terminal 3 ===
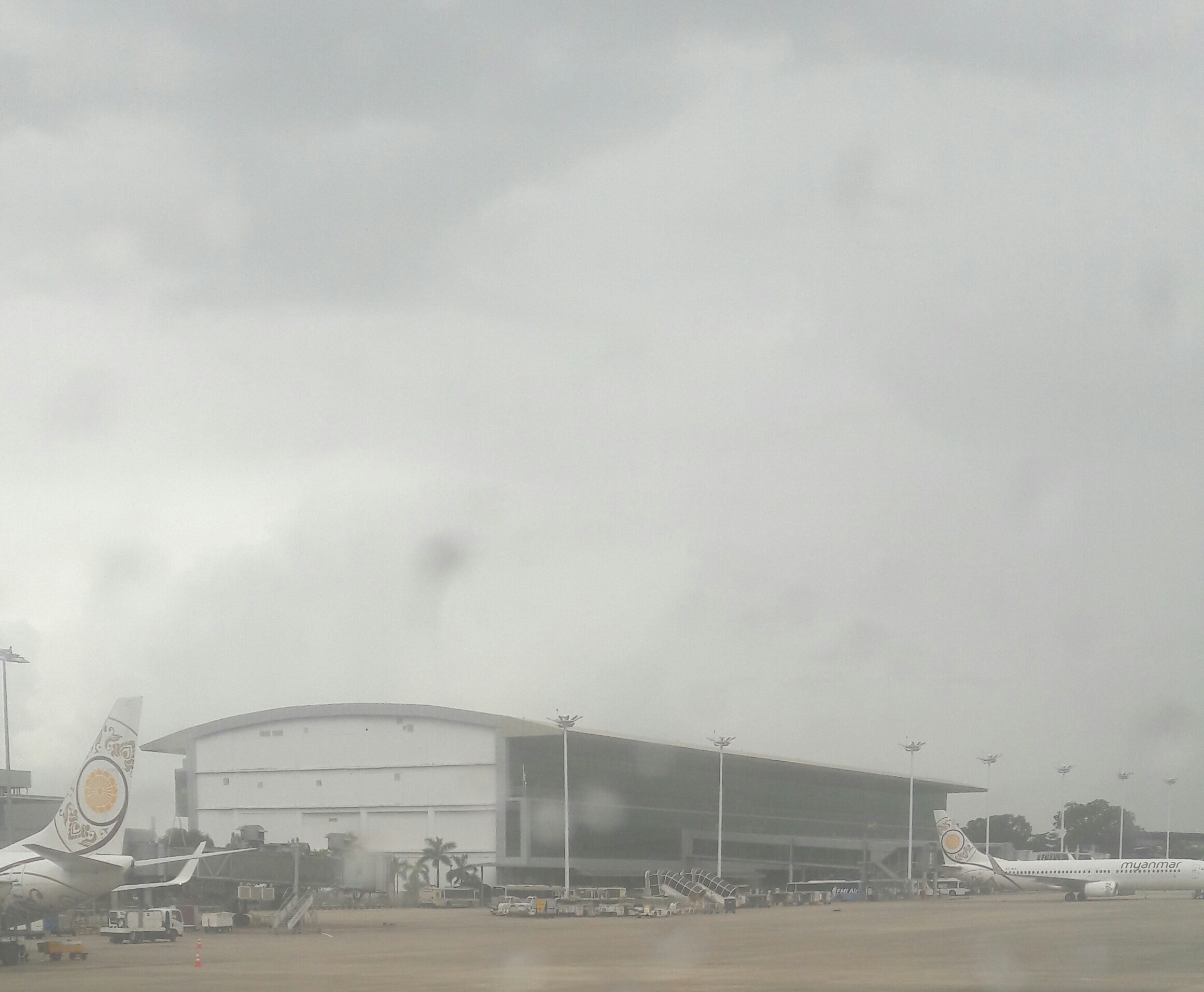
Terminal 3 in 2017

Terminal 3, which is used for domestic flights, opened on 5 December 2016, replacing the old domestic terminal, which was demolished in August 2014.

=== Guard of Honour Building (VIP terminal) ===
The former VIP terminal was temporarily used as the domestic terminal until Terminal 3 was completed. The Guard of Honour Building was demolished to make way for a connector between Terminals 1 and 2.

== Airlines and destinations ==
=== Passenger ===
Airlines	Destinations
Air China	Beijing–Capital
Air India	Delhi–Indira Gandhi
Cambodia Airways	Phnom Penh
China Airlines	Taipei–Taoyuan
China Eastern Airlines	Kunming
China Southern Airlines	Guangzhou
Korean Air	Seoul–Incheon
Malaysia Airlines	Kuala Lumpur–International
Myanmar Airways International	Bangkok–Don Mueang, Bangkok–Suvarnabhumi, Changsha, Chennai, Chiang Mai, Da Nang, Delhi–Indira Gandhi, Dhaka, Dubai–International, Guangzhou, Hanoi, Ho Chi Minh City, Kolkata, Kuala Lumpur–International, Nanning, Naypyidaw, Novosibirsk, Penang, Phnom Penh, Phuket, Seoul–Incheon, Singapore, Vientiane; Seasonal: Gaya
Myanmar National Airlines	Bangkok–Don Mueang, Bangkok–Suvarnabhumi, Chiang Mai, Kunming, Naypyidaw, Singapore
Singapore Airlines	Singapore
Thai AirAsia	Bangkok–Don Mueang
Thai Airways International	Bangkok–Suvarnabhumi
West Air	Chongqing, Nanning, Taiyuan

== Statistics ==
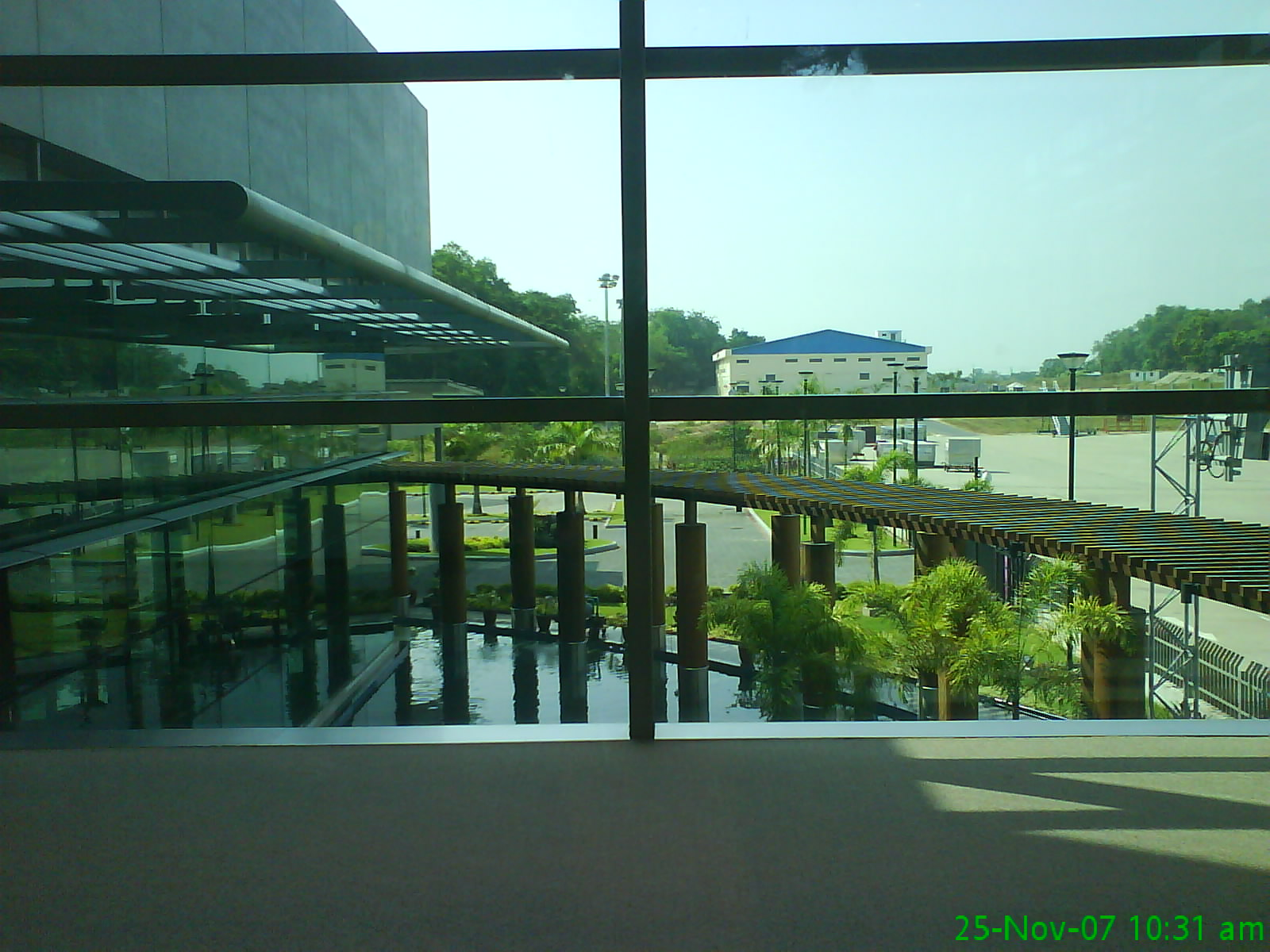
The courtyard (Terminal 2), seen from the airport departure lounge

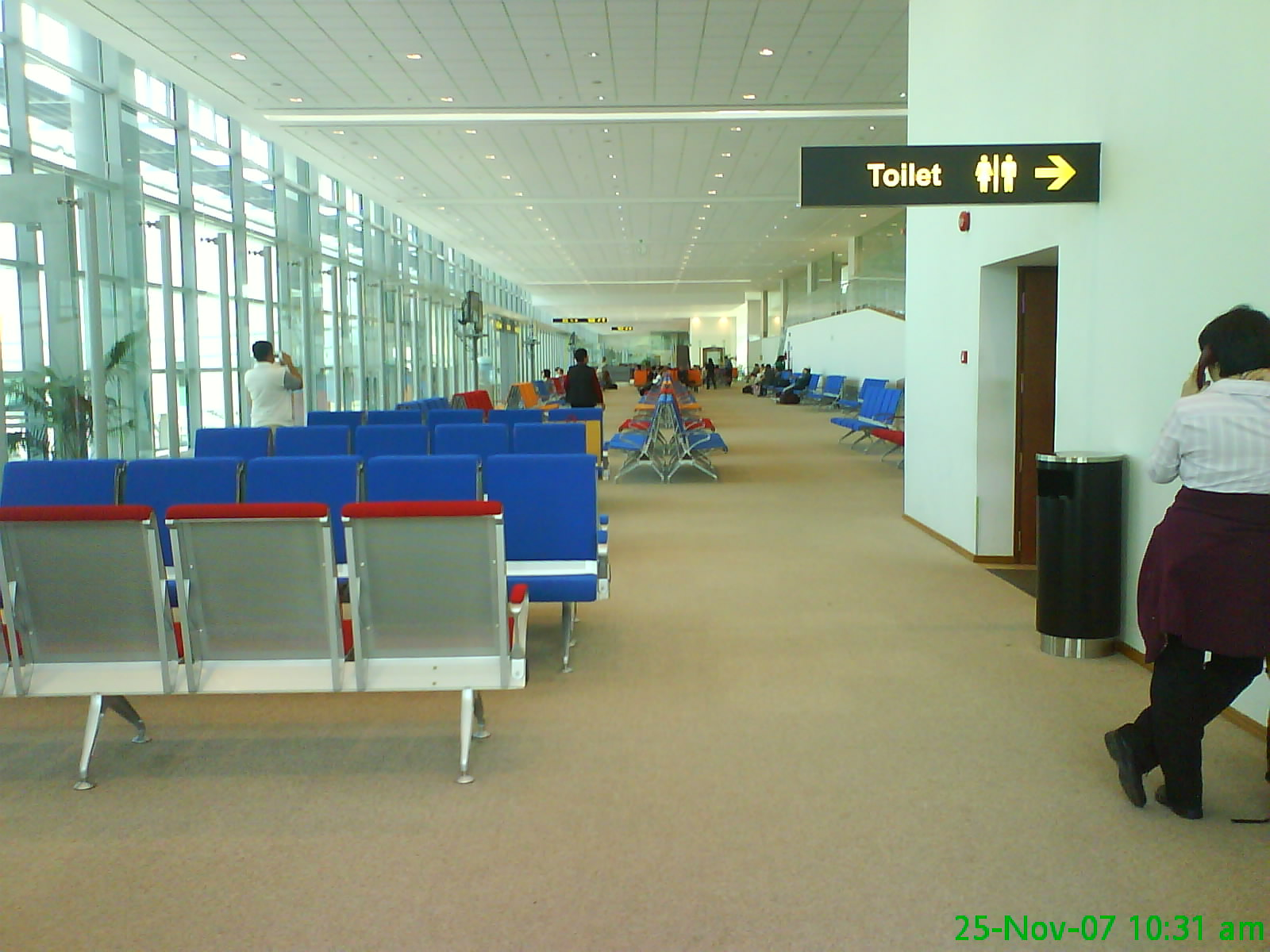
The departure lounge - Gate 1 (Terminal 2)

=== Top destinations ===
Busiest international passenger flights out of Yangon by weekly flights, as of February 2026
Rank	Destinations	Frequency (weekly)
1	(Thailand) Bangkok–Suvarnabhumi	82
2	Singapore-Changi	32
3	(Thailand) Bangkok–Don Mueang	28
4	(Thailand) Chiang Mai	18
5	(Malaysia) Kuala Lumpur–International	17
6	(China) Kunming–Changshui	11
7	(China) Guangzhou–Baiyun	11
8	(Vietnam) Hanoi	7
9	(India) Gaya	7
10	(South Korea) Seoul-Incheon	5

=== Traffic by calendar year ===
	Passengers	Change from previous year	Movements	Cargo (tons)
2016	5,454,188		70,307	
2017	5,916,597	▲8.48%	78,076	
2018	6,104,854	▲3.18%		
Source: Yangon International Airport

== Accidents and incidents ==
- On 25 March 1978, Fokker F-27 Friendship 200 XY-ADK lost height and crashed into a paddy field just after takeoff from Mingaladon Airport, killing all 48 people on board.
- On 27 January 1998, a Myanma Airways Fokker F27 crashed while taking off from Yangon, Myanmar, killing 16 of the 45 people on board.
- On 29 January 2017, U Ko Ni, a constitutional lawyer and advisor to Aung San Suu Kyi, was assassinated outside Gate 6 of the airport.

== Airport shuttle bus ==
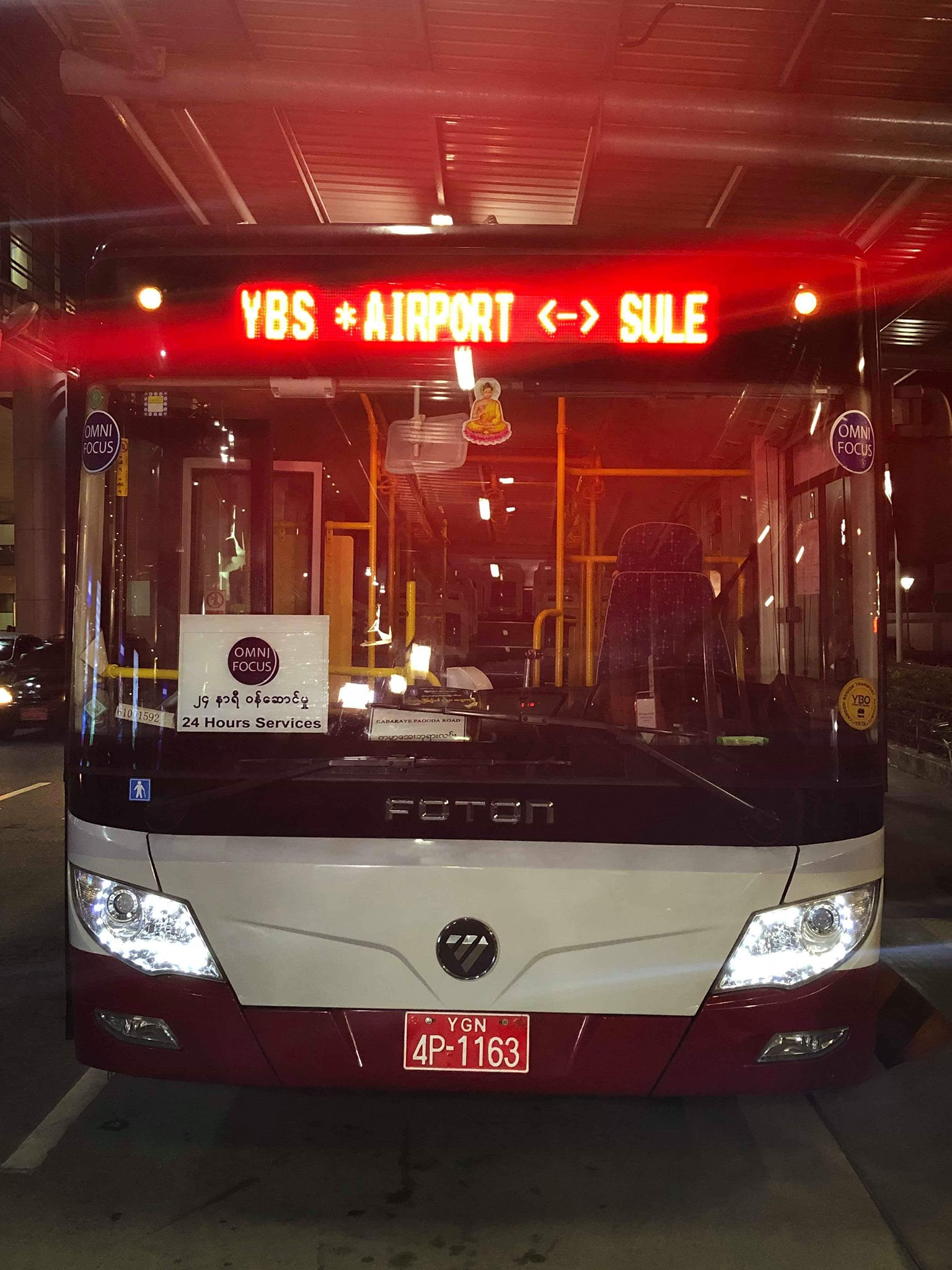
YBS shuttle bus

The Yangon Bus Service (YBS) provides airport shuttle bus line that stop at 13 bus stops between Yangon International Airport and Yangon Central Railway Station. The buses make stops at Yangon International Airport, 8 Mile, Nawade, Kaba-Aye Pagoda, Lanni, Hanmithit, Shwegondine, Bahan 3rd Street, Kyauktaing, Yauklan and Sule Pagoda. Stops on the return journey include Sule, Yangon Railway Station, Zoological Gardens, Bahan 3rd Street, Shwegondine, Lanni, Kaba-Aye Pagoda, Nawade, 8 Mile and the airport.
