= Air Thanlwin =

Myanma airline

Air Thanlwin သံလွင် လေကြောင်းလိုင်း

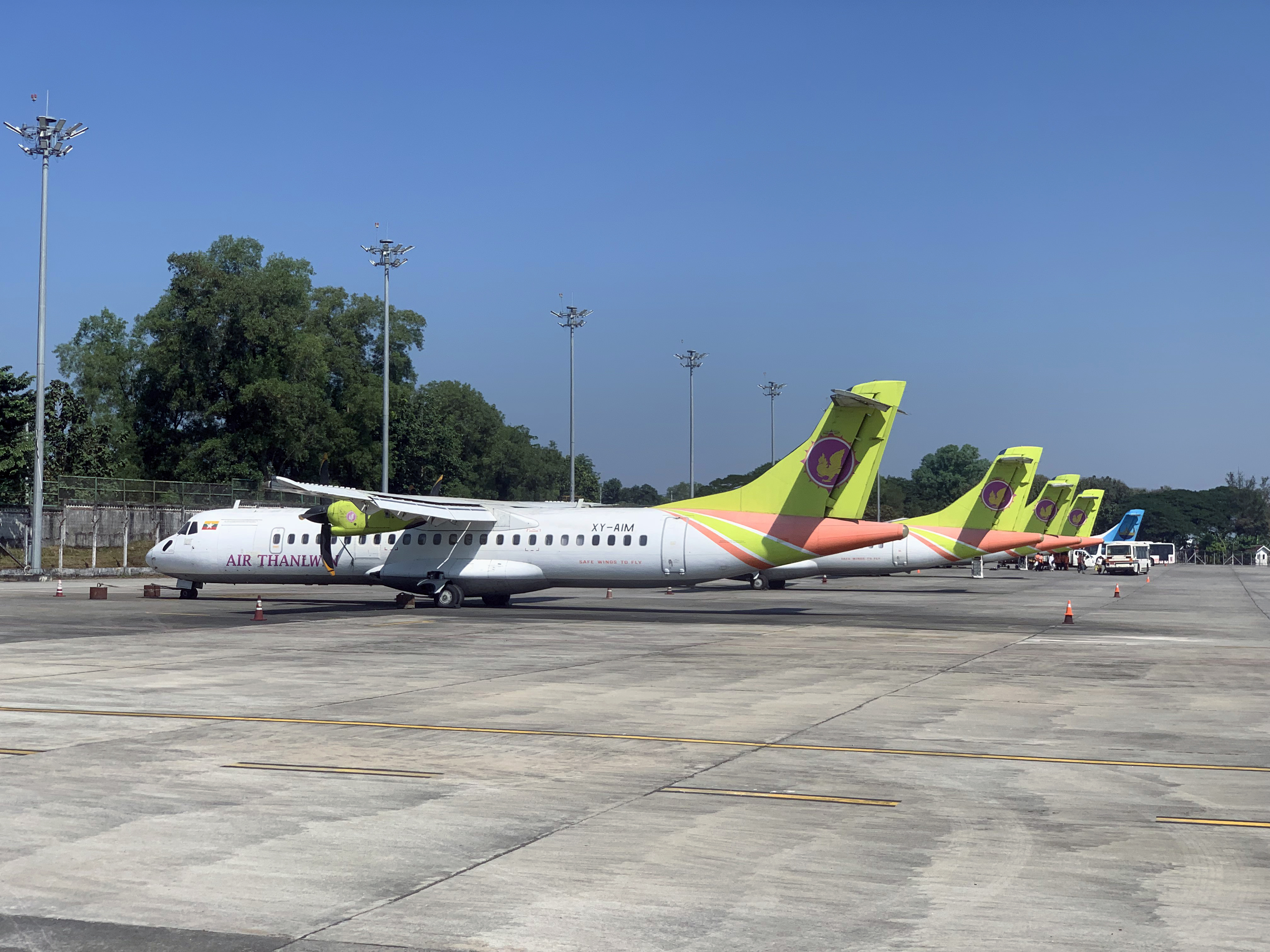
- Air Thanlwin fleet
IATA	ICAO	Call sign
ST	RTL	ROYAL BIRD
- Founded: 1996; 30 years ago (as Yangon Airways)
- Hubs: Yangon International Airport
- Secondary hubs: Mandalay International Airport
- Fleet size: 4
- Destinations: 11
- Parent company: Air Thanlwin Holding Company Ltd.
- Headquarters: Yangon, Myanmar
- Key people: Aung Min Khaing
- Website: www.airthanlwin.com

Air Thanlwin (Burmese: သံလွင် လေကြောင်းလိုင်း) is an airline based in Yangon, Myanmar, offering scheduled and chartered domestic flights from its base at Yangon International Airport. The airline was founded in 1996 as Yangon Airways and operated under that name until it rebranded as Air Thanlwin in October 2019, making it the newest airline to emerge in Myanmar.

== History ==
Yangon Airways was established in October 1996 as a domestic airline in a joint venture between Myanma Airways, the state-owned flag carrier in Myanmar, and Krong-Sombat Company of Thailand. The airline's headquarters and maintenance station are in Yangon. In October 1997, the current owner of the airline acquired the share of the Thai company and then acquired the share of Myanmar Airways in 2005. Thereafter, the airline became a fully privately owned airline in Myanmar. The airline then evolved into a principal domestic service carrier, operating scheduled and charter flight services from Yangon to 13 prime commercial and tourist destinations in Myanmar. During the past three years, Yangon Airways has been progressively gaining market share; it has about 37% in 2007 and increased to 41% in 2008.

Yangon Airways was listed by the United States Department of Treasury Office of Foreign Assets Control (OFAC) on its Specially Designated Nationals and Blocked Persons (SDN) list. Under United States federal law, Americans are prohibited from doing business with any individual or entity listed as an SDN. Yangon Airways was designated by OFAC in 2008 after being acquired by notorious drug traffickers of the United Wa State Army.

Yangon Airways was rebranded and operated as Air Thanlwin in 2019, using the same fleet, adding another ATR 72-500 leased from Myanmar National Airlines.

== Destinations ==
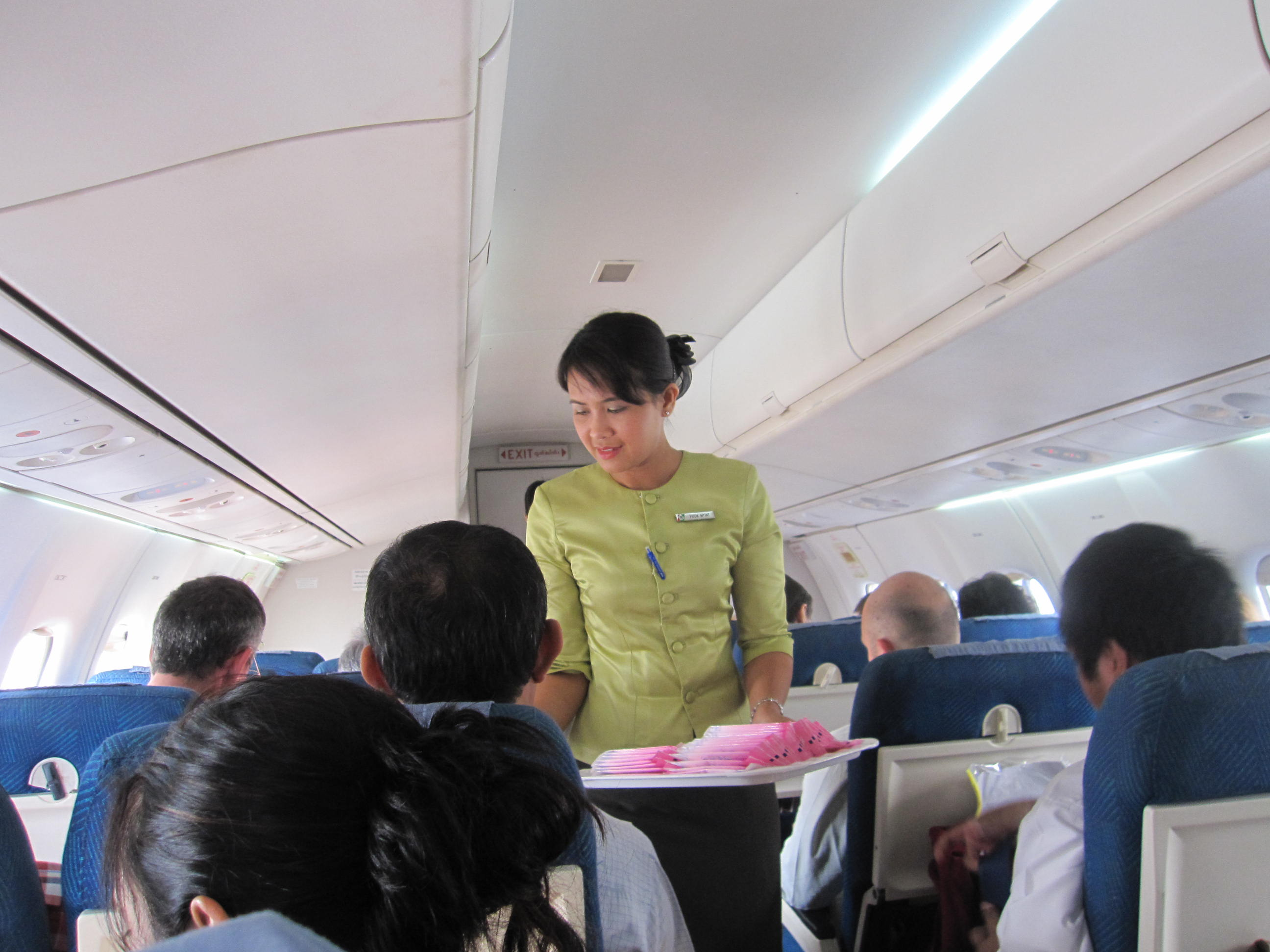
Inflight cabin view aboard a Yangon Airways flight

As of January 2024, Air Thanlwin operates scheduled flights to the following domestic destinations:

Country	City	Airport	Notes	Refs
Myanmar	Bagan	Nyaung U Airport	Terminated	
Myanmar	Bhamo	Bhamo Airport	Terminated	
Myanmar	Dawei	Dawei Airport		
Myanmar	Heho	Heho Airport	Terminated	
Myanmar	Hkamti	Khamti Airport	Terminated	
Myanmar	Kawthaung	Kawthaung Airport	Terminated	
Myanmar	Kengtung	Kengtung Airport	Terminated	
Myanmar	Lashio	Lashio Airport	Terminated	
Myanmar	Loikaw	Loikaw Airport		
Myanmar	Mandalay	Mandalay International Airport	Secondary Hub	
Myanmar	Myeik	Myeik Airport	Terminated	
Myanmar	Myitkyina	Myitkyina Airport	Terminated	
Myanmar	Mawlamyine	Mawlamyine Airport		
Myanmar	Naypyidaw	Naypyidaw International Airport		
Myanmar	Putao	Lashio Airport	Terminated	
Myanmar	Sittwe	Sittwe Airport	Terminated	
Myanmar	Tachilek	Tachilek Airport		
Myanmar	Thandwe	Thandwe Airport	Terminated	
Myanmar	Yangon	Yangon International Airport	Primary Hub	

== Fleet ==
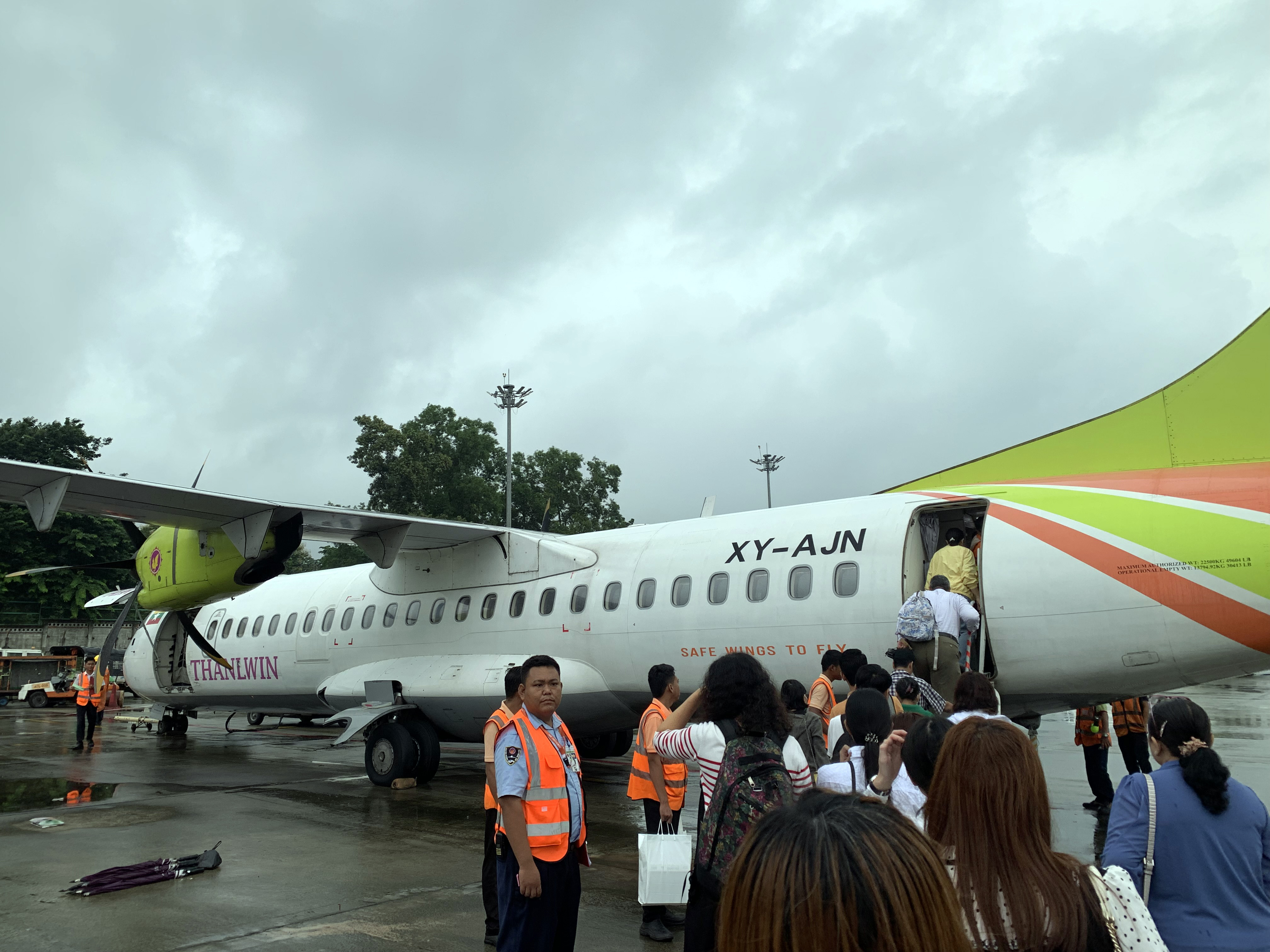
Air Thanlwin ATR 72

As of August 2025, Air Thanlwin operates the following aircraft:

Air Thanlwin fleet
Aircraft	In Fleet	Seats	Notes
ATR 72-200	2	55	Parked due to old age.
ATR 72-500	2	68	
Total	4		
