= Tachilek Airport =

- IATA: THL; ICAO: VYTL

Summary
- Airport type: Public
- Operator: Government
- Serves: Tachilek, Myanmar
- Elevation AMSL: 1,275 ft / 389 m
- Coordinates: 20°29′01″N 099°56′07″E

Map
- Location of airport in Myanmar

Runways
Direction	Length		Surface
Direction	m	ft	Surface
04/22	2,134	7,002	Bitumin
- Source: DAFIF

Tachilek Airport or Tachileik Airport (IATA: THL, ICAO: VYTL) is an airport serving Tachilek (Tachileik), a town in the Shan State of eastern Myanmar.

== Airlines and destinations ==
Airlines	Destinations
Mann Yadanarpon Airlines	Heho, Kyaingtong, Lashio, Mandalay, Myitkyina
Mingalar Aviation Services	Heho, Yangon
Myanmar Airways International	Yangon
Myanmar National Airlines	Heho, Yangon
