= Heho Airport =

Airport in eastern Myanmar

Heho Airport ဟဲဟိုးလေဆိပ်
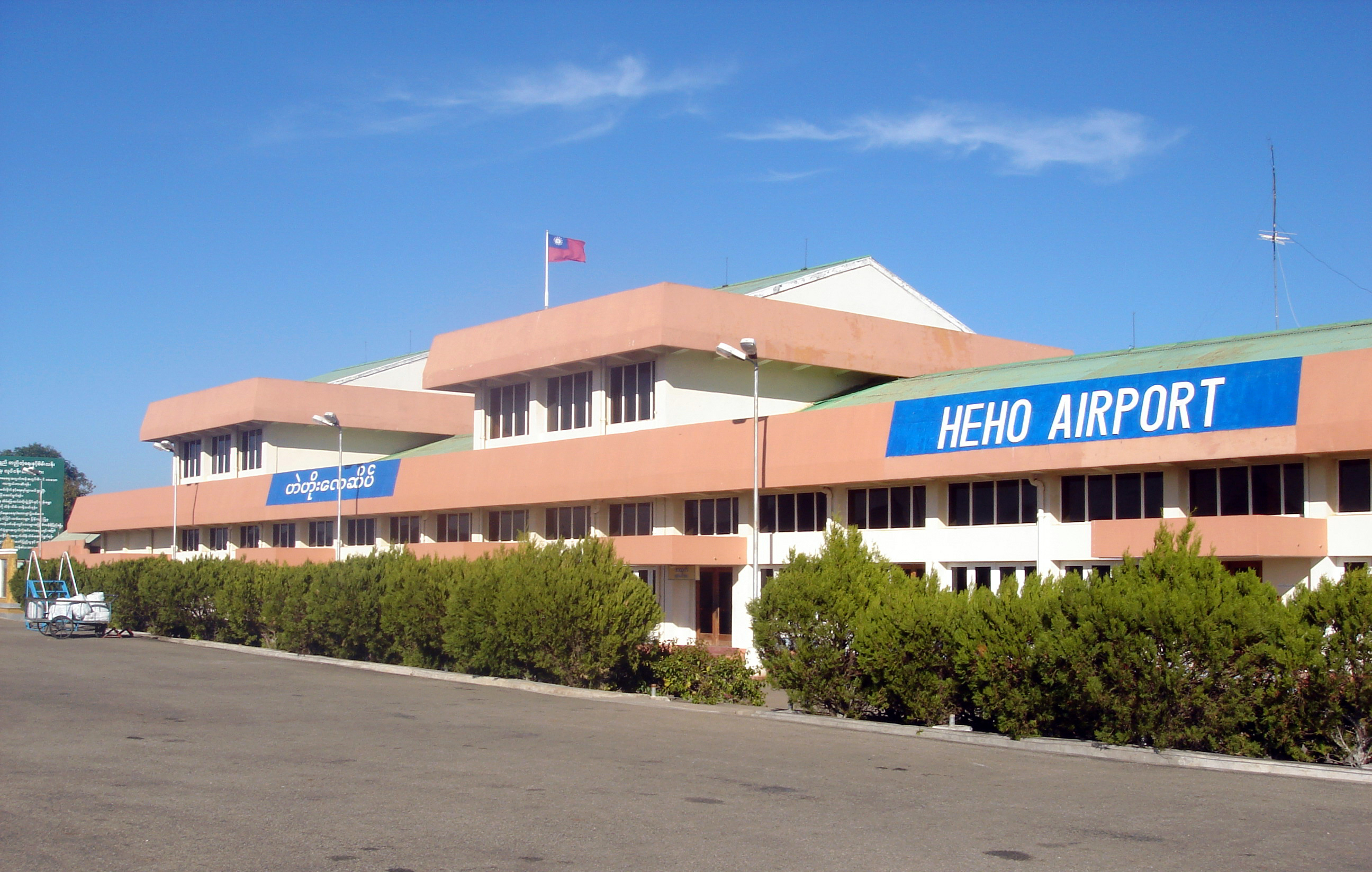
- IATA: HEH; ICAO: VYHH

Summary
- Airport type: Public
- Operator: Government
- Serves: Heho, Myanmar
- Elevation AMSL: 3,858 ft (1,176 m)
- Coordinates: 20°44′49″N 096°47′31″E

Map
- Location of airport in Myanmar

Runways
Direction	Length		Surface
Direction	ft	m	Surface
18/36	8,500	2,591	Asphalt

Heho Airport (Burmese: ဟဲဟိုးလေဆိပ်) (IATA: HEH, ICAO: VYHH) is an airport serving Heho, a town in Kalaw Township, Taunggyi District, Shan State, Myanmar. It is the main airport serving Inle Lake and Taunggyi, the former being the top tourist destinations of Myanmar.

== History ==
The airport served as an airbase both for the Allies and the Japanese during World War II. The airbase was heavily bombed by the Allies. Evidence of aircraft bunker revetments and bomb craters can still be seen on the southern end of the airfield, especially noticeable from the air.

== Facilities ==
The airport resides at an elevation of 3,858 feet (1,176 m) above mean sea level. It has one runway designated 18/36 with an asphalt surface measuring 8,500 by 100 feet (2,591 m × 30 m). The original airport had a runway length of 5,500 feet (1,676 m). It was recently expanded to accommodate jet aircraft.

== Airlines and destinations ==
Airlines	Destinations
Air Thanlwin	Mandalay, Nay Pyi Taw, Yangon
Mann Yatanarpon Airlines	Kengtung, Loikaw, Mandalay, Myitkyina, Nay Pyi Taw, Nyaung U, Tachilek, Thandwe, Yangon
Mingalar Aviation Services	Loikaw, Mandalay, Thandwe, Yangon
Myanmar Airways International	Kengtung, Loikaw, Yangon
Myanmar National Airlines	Kengtung, Lashio, Loikaw, Mong Hsat, Nyaung U, Tachilek, Yangon

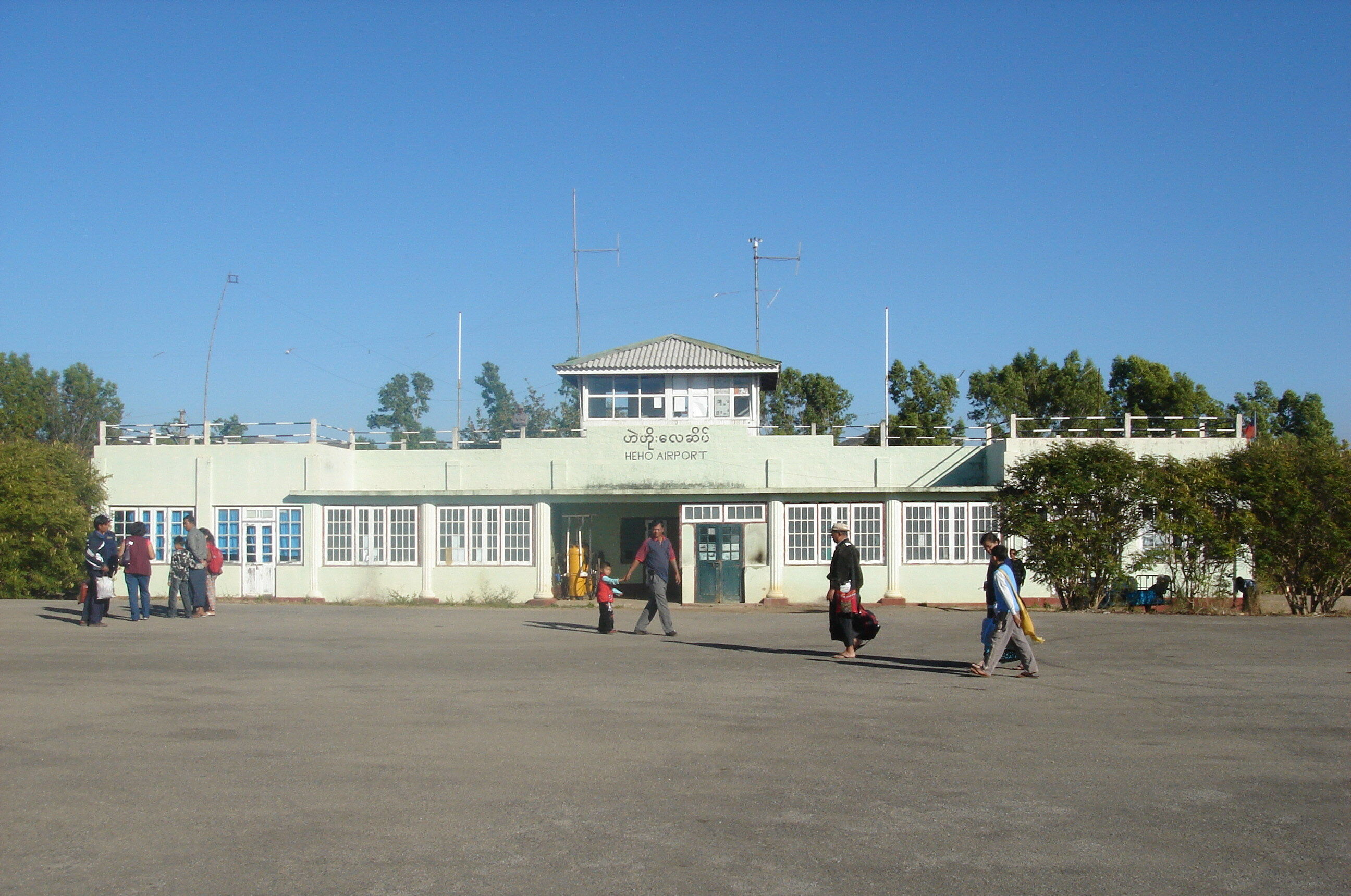
Old Building of Heho Airport

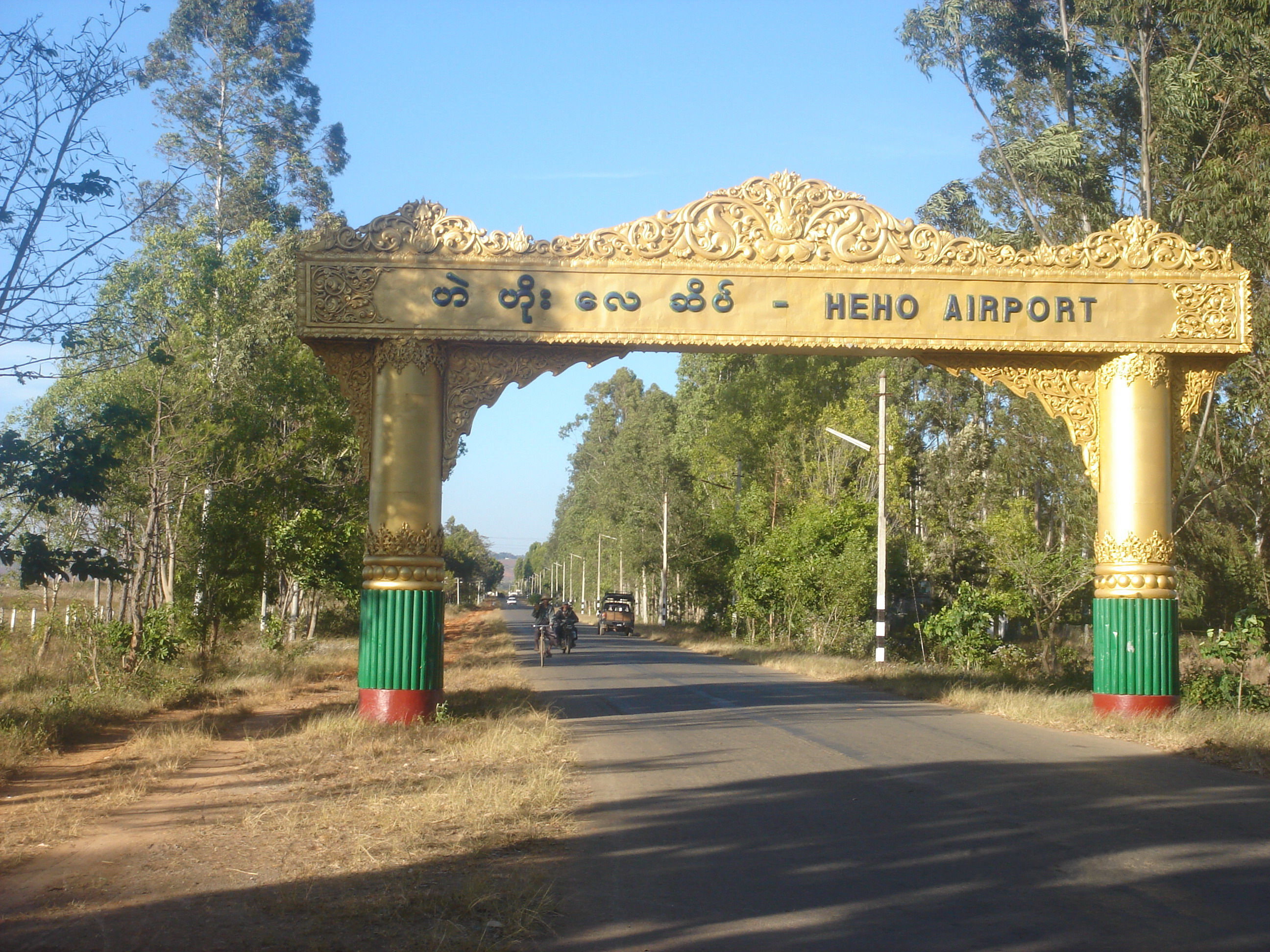
Main Entrance of Heho Airport

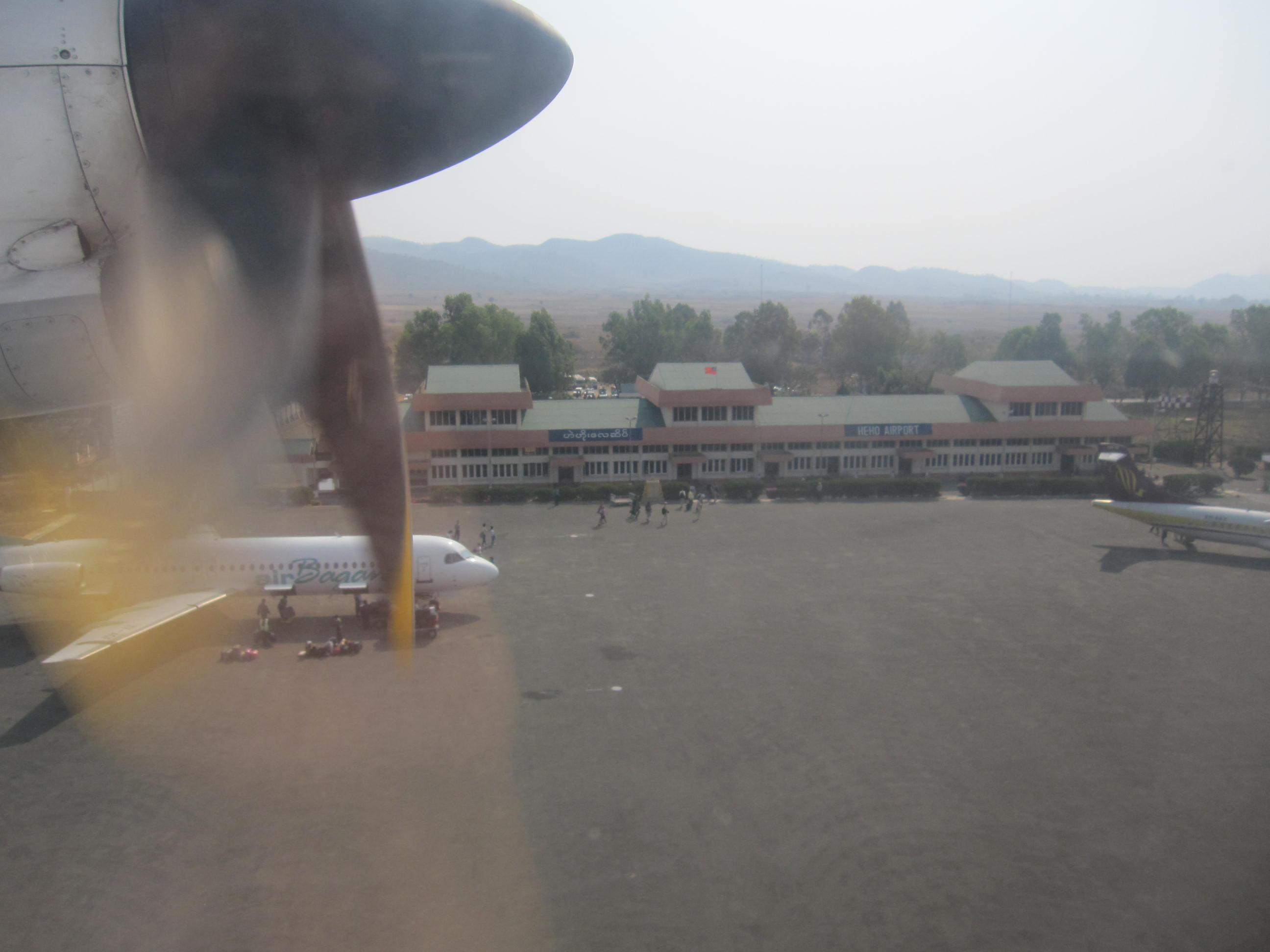
Aerial view of Heho Airport

== Accidents and incidents ==
- On 25 December 2012, Air Bagan Flight 11, crashed short of the runway at Heho Airport. One passenger on board the aircraft and another on the ground were killed in the accident.
- On 21 June 1987, a Myanmar Airways Fokker F-27 Friendship 200 crashed into a mountain soon after take-off from Heho Airport, killing all 45 people on board.
- On 11 October 1987, a Burma Airways Fokker F-27 Friendship 500 crashed into a 1500 feet high mountain, killing all 49 people on board. This was Myanmar's second-deadliest air disaster, surpassed only by the crash of a Myanmar Air Force Shaanxi Y-8 in 2017, which killed 122 people. Thirty-six foreigners—14 Americans, seven Swiss citizens, five Britons, four Australians, three West Germans, two French citizens and one Thai—were among the dead.
