= Thandwe Airport =

- IATA: SNW; ICAO: VYTD

Summary
- Airport type: Public
- Operator: Government
- Serves: Thandwe, Myanmar
- Elevation AMSL: 47 ft (14 m)
- Coordinates: 18°27′38″N 094°18′00″E

Map
- Location of airport in Myanmar

Runways
Direction	Length		Surface
Direction	m	ft	Surface
02/20	2,600	5,502	Bitumen
- Source: DAFIF

Thandwe Airport (IATA: SNW, ICAO: VYTD) is an airport serving Thandwe, a town in the Rakhine State of Myanmar. The IATA code is based on the town's name during British colonial rule, Sandoway. On 23 June 2024, the Arakan Army captured the airport.

== Airlines and destinations ==
Airlines	Destinations
Air Thanlwin	Yangon
Mann Yadanarpon Airlines	Sittwe, Yangon
Mingalar Aviation Services	Heho, Sittwe, Yangon
Myanmar National Airlines	Kyaukpyu, Mandalay, Pathein, Yangon

== Accidents and incidents ==
- On 16 August 1972, a Douglas C-47B, registration XY-ACM of Burma Airways crashed shortly after take-off on a scheduled passenger flight. Twenty-eight people on board were killed and only 3 survived.
- On 17 February 2012, Air KBZ ATR-72-500, XY-AIT overran the runway at Thandwe Airport but no injuries were reported.
