= Khamti Airport =

- IATA: KHM; ICAO: VYKI

Summary
- Airport type: Public
- Serves: Khamti, Myanmar
- Elevation AMSL: 6,000 ft / 1,809 m
- Coordinates: 25°59′18″N 95°40′28″E

Map
- Location of airport in Myanmar

Runways
| Direction | Length | | Surface |
| Direction | m | ft | Surface |
|---|---|---|---|
| 03/21 | 1,646 | 5,400 | Bitumen |
- Source: Great Circle Mapper

Khamti Airport (IATA: KHM, ICAO: VYKI), also known as Hkamti Airport, is an airport serving Khamti (Hkamti), a town in the Khamti (Hkamti) District of the Sagaing Division in northwestern Myanmar.

== Facilities ==
The airport is at an elevation of 6,000 feet (1,829 m) above mean sea level. It has one runway which measures 1,280 by 26 metres (4,199 ft × 85 ft). The runway was extended in 2005.

== Airlines and destinations ==
| Airlines | Destinations |
|---|---|
| Air Thanlwin | Mandalay, Yangon |
| Mingalar Aviation Services | Mandalay, Yangon |
| Myanmar National Airlines | Mandalay, Yangon |
