= Mingalar Aviation Services =

Airline from Myanmar

IATA	ICAO	Call sign
K7	KBZ	JADE AIR
- Founded: June 2010; 16 years ago (as Air KBZ)
- Commenced operations: 2 April 2011; 15 years ago
- Hubs: Yangon International Airport
- Secondary hubs: Mandalay International Airport
- Frequent-flyer program: Sky Smile Frequent Flyer Program
- Fleet size: 4
- Destinations: 15
- Parent company: 24 Hour Group of Companies
- Headquarters: Yangon, Myanmar
- Key people: U Aung Aung Zaw (Chairman)
- Website: www.mingalaraviation.com

Mingalar Aviation Services (Burmese: မင်္ဂလာ လေကြောင်းပို့ဆောင်ရေးလုပ်ငန်း) formerly known as Air Kanbawza or Air KBZ, is a privately owned domestic airline in Myanmar based in Yangon.

== History ==
The airline was established in June 2010 as Air Kanbawza by KBZ Group of Companies, then owned by Aung Ko Win. The airline began operations with domestic scheduled services from Yangon, Myanmar on 2 April 2011. In 2015 Air KBZ began codesharing international flights with its partner Myanmar Airways International, and on 2 December 2016, Air KBZ itself expanded internationally, launching its first scheduled service outside Myanmar with flights connecting Yangon and Chiang Mai in neighboring Thailand.

In late 2018, 24 Hour Group, owned by Aung Aung Zaw, bought Air KBZ. In December 2023, KBZ completed its exit from Air KBZ. On 6 January 2024, the new owner launched a rebranding initiative, renaming the airline to Mingalar Aviation Services ("Mingalar").

== Destinations ==
Mingalar Aviation Services serves the following destinations as of January 2024:

Country	City	Airport	Notes	Refs
India	Imphal	Imphal Airport	Charter	
Myanmar	Bagan	Nyaung U Airport		
Myanmar	Dawei	Dawei Airport		
Myanmar	Heho	Heho Airport		
Myanmar	Kawthaung	Kawthaung Airport		
Myanmar	Kengtung	Kengtung Airport		
Myanmar	Kyaukpyu	Kyaukpyu Airport		
Myanmar	Lashio	Lashio Airport		
Myanmar	Loikaw	Loikaw Airport		
Myanmar	Mandalay	Mandalay International Airport	Hub	
Myanmar	Myitkyina	Myitkyina Airport		
Myanmar	Putao	Putao Airport		
Myanmar	Sittwe	Sittwe Airport		
Myanmar	Thandwe	Thandwe Airport		
Myanmar	Yangon	Yangon International Airport	Hub	

=== Codeshare agreements ===
Mingalar Aviation Services has codeshare agreements with the following airlines:

- Myanmar Airways International

== Fleet ==
=== Current fleet ===
As of August 2025, Mingalar Aviation Services operates the following aircraft:

Mingalar fleet
Aircraft	In fleet	Orders	Notes
ATR 72-600	4		
Total	4		

=== Former fleet ===
The airline previously operated the following aircraft under the name of Air KBZ (as of April 2024):

- 6 ATR 72-500
- 5 ATR 72-600, 1 sold to Mann Yadanarpon Airlines

== Sponsorships ==
In 2014, Mingalar Aviation Services started sponsoring Myanmar's national sport, lethwei. The event is called the Air KBZ Aung Lan Golden Belt Championship, and is held at Thein Phyu Stadium in Yangon.
