= Myanmar Airways =

Myanmar Airways may refer to:

- Myanmar National Airlines, a state-owned airline and the flag carrier of Myanmar, based in Yangon
- Myanmar Airways International, a privately owned airline in Yangon, Myanmar
