= Kalaymyo Airport =

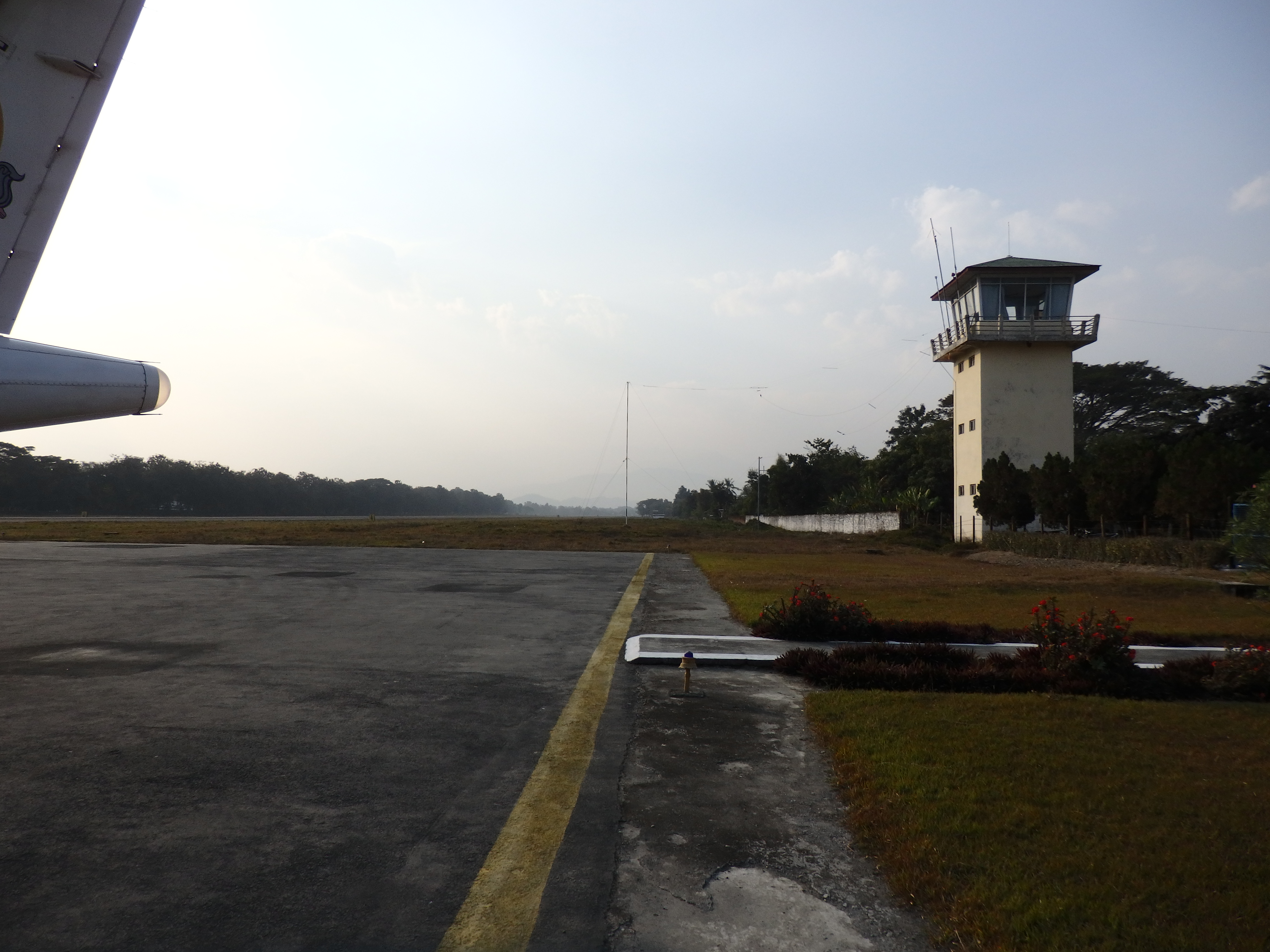
- IATA: KMV; ICAO: VYKL

Summary
- Airport type: Public
- Operator: Government
- Location: Kalaymyo, Myanmar
- Elevation AMSL: 439 ft / 134 m
- Coordinates: 23°11′19″N 094°03′03″E

Map
- Location of airport in Myanmar

Runways
Direction	Length		Surface
Direction	m	ft	Surface
09/27	2,100	6,882	Asphalt
- Source: DAFIF

Kalaymyo Airport (IATA: KMV, ICAO: VYKL) is a domestic airport serving Kalaymyo (a.k.a. Kalay or Kalemyo), a town in the Sagaing Division of Myanmar. It is an airport at Kalay, an extension of a British-built Second World War airstrip that was used to ferry troops and supplies into Myanmar during the British reconquest of Myanmar in 1945. The airport is located in the middle of the town. The airport is at an elevation of 499 feet (152 m); it has 29 meters (95 ft) wide and 2,100 meters (6,882 ft) long runway with a blacktopped surface.

== Airlines and destinations ==
Airlines	Destinations
Mingalar Aviation Services	Mandalay, Yangon
Myanmar National Airlines	Mandalay, Yangon
