= Kyaukpyu Airport =

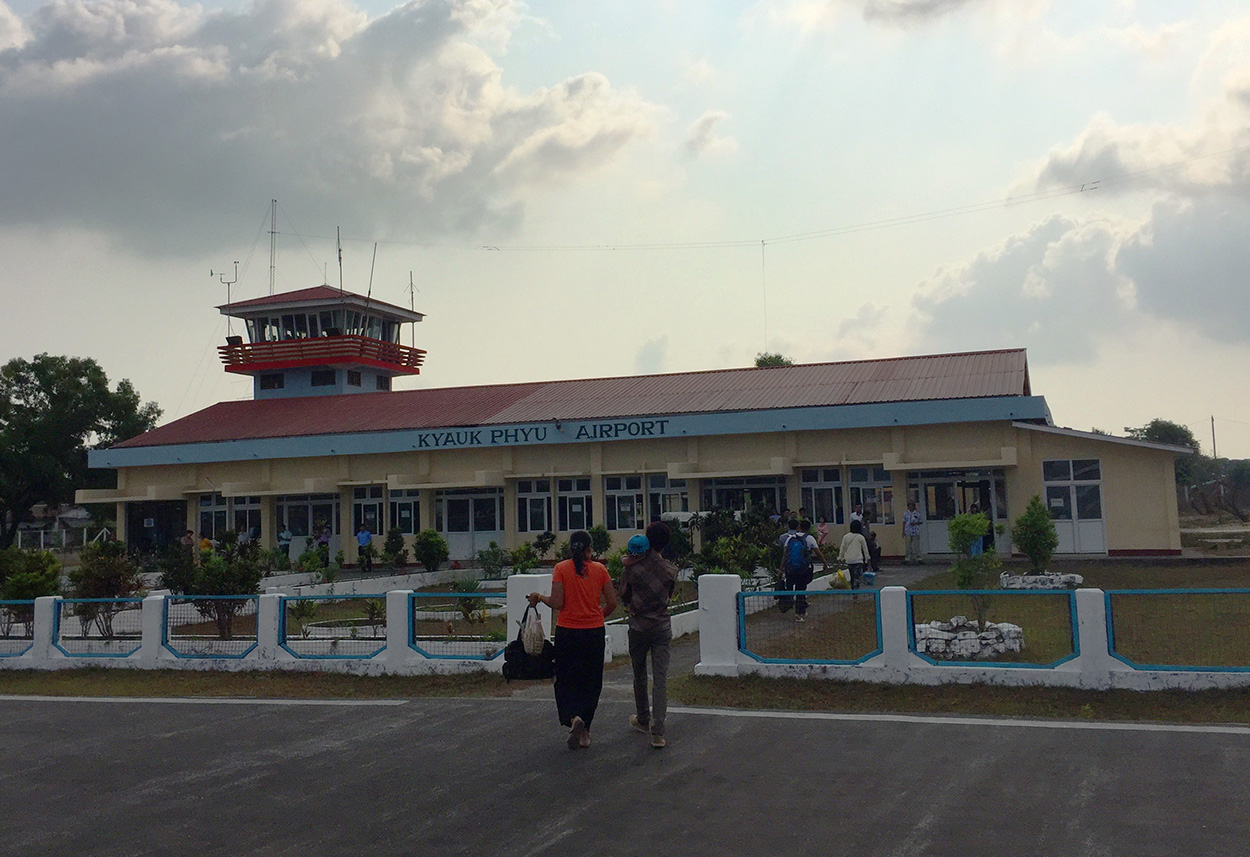
- IATA: KYP; ICAO: VYKP

Summary
- Location: Kyaukpyu, Myanmar
- Elevation AMSL: 20 ft / 6 m
- Coordinates: 19°25′35″N 093°32′05″E

Map
- Location of airport in Myanmar

Runways
| Direction | Length | | Surface |
| Direction | ft | m | Surface |
|---|---|---|---|
| 18/36 | 7,000 | 2,100 | Bitumen |

Kyaukpyu Airport is an airport in Kyaukpyu, Myanmar (IATA: KYP, ICAO: VYKP).

The runway of Kyaukpyu Airport was 1,408 metres (4,620 ft) long and 30 metres (100 ft) wide. It is able to handle Fokker F28 Fellowship jet aircraft used by Myanma Airways. It is planned to extend the runway by 305 metres (1,000 ft) in 2011 and 427 metres (1,400 ft) in next two years. After that it will have a length of 2,134 metres (7,000 ft) (ATR 72 capable) and a width of 30 metres (100 ft). It appears this never happened, in fact as of 2020, its only 762 metres (2,500 ft), but new attention for runway completion and terminal upgrade.

== Airlines and destinations ==
| Airlines | Destinations |
|---|---|
| Myanmar National Airlines | Sittwe, Thandwe, Yangon |
