= Myanmar Airways International =

Airline of Myanmar

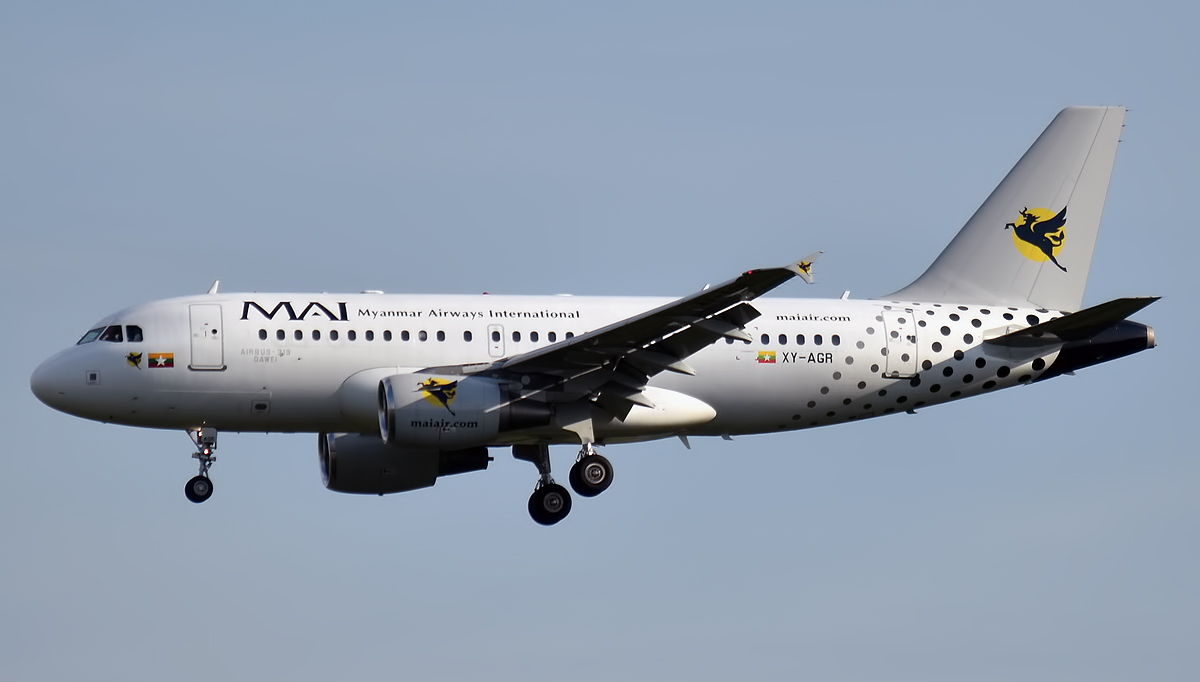
- Myanmar Airways International Airbus A319
| IATA | ICAO | Call sign |
|---|---|---|
| 8M | MMA | MYANMAR |
- Founded: 1993; 33 years ago
- Commenced operations: August 1993; 33 years ago
- Hubs: Yangon International Airport
- Secondary hubs: Mandalay International Airport
- Focus cities: Mandalay International Airport
- Frequent-flyer program: Sky Smile Privilege Program
- Fleet size: 13
- Destinations: 30
- Parent company: 24 Hour Group of Companies
- Headquarters: Yangon, Myanmar
- Employees: over 1,739
- Website: www.maiair.com

Myanmar Airways International Co., Ltd. (Burmese: အပြည်ပြည်ဆိုင်ရာ မြန်မာ့လေကြောင်းလိုင်း) is a privately owned airline headquartered in Yangon, Myanmar. It operates scheduled international services to destinations mainly in Southeast Asia and is based at Yangon International Airport. Myanmar Airways International was the sponsor of the 2013 Southeast Asian Games. MAI's logo shows pyinsarupa (Burmese: ပဉ္စရူပ), a traditional Burmese chimeric animal. Myanmar Airways International is Myanmar's safest airline, achieving a 7-star safety record from IOSA.

== History ==
=== Early years ===
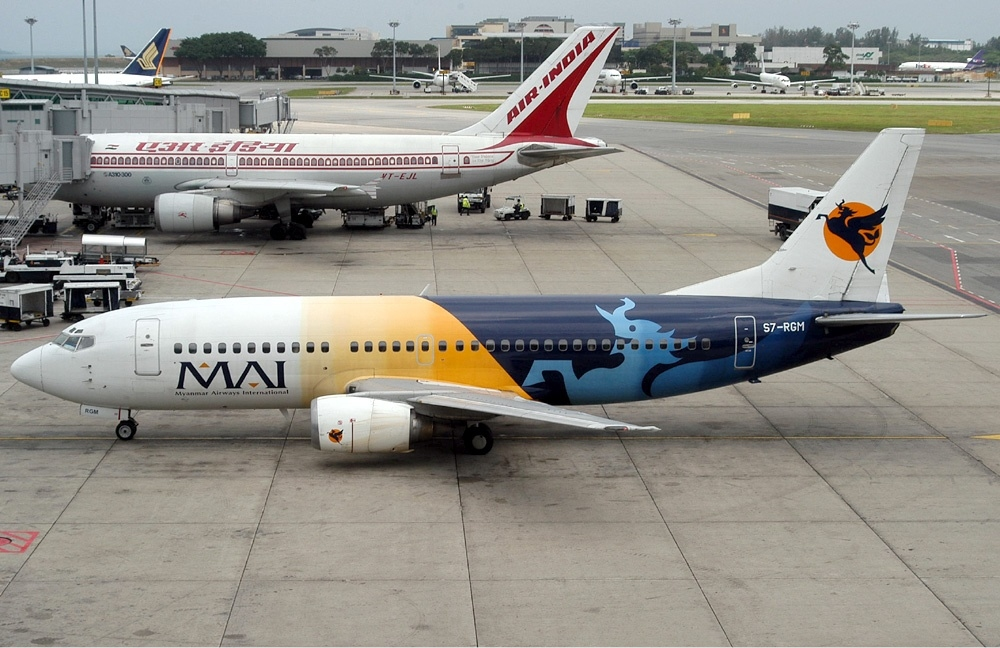
A now retired MAI Boeing 737-300 in 2002

The airline was founded in 1993.

Myanmar Airways International (MAI) took off in August 1993, initially created as a joint venture between Myanmar Airways and Singapore-based Highsonic Enterprises, with the support of Royal Brunei Airlines. It boasted a Singapore management team with (many ex-Singapore Airlines staff), new Boeing aircraft, all-expatriate cockpit crews, improved training for flight attendants and new UK Civil Aviation Authority operating standards. Eventually, the original joint venture was terminated and MAI became a wholly owned Myanmar company.

On December 5, 2000, Singapore-based Region Air signed a long-term joint venture agreement with Myanmar Airways International (MAI), acquiring a 49% stake. The agreement, which took effect on January 1, 2001, involved Region Air providing management, marketing, accounting, finance strategy, technical, and operations management.

In 2001, a new corporate identity and aircraft livery were rolled out and the company completed its first major cabin-crew-upgrading program. In 2002, the airline obtained new International Air Transport Association (IATA) airline designator codes and joined both the IATA Multilateral Interline Traffic Agreement (MITA) and IATA Clearing House. The airline sent 122 employees on training courses at Malaysia Airlines and Royal Brunei Airlines training centers. In 2003, MAI launched a code-share agreement with Thai Airways International on the Bangkok-Yangon-Bangkok route. The company also has code-sharing with Malaysia Airlines, Qatar Airways and Jetstar Asia. In 2004, the airline took delivery of new uniforms for ground staff and recruited a further 16 new cabin-crew trainees.

In February 2007, the foreign management team under Region Air Myanmar (HK) Ltd. transferred its control to MAI.

=== Expansion and modernisation ===
Myanmar Airways International (MAI) was founded in 1993 as an international airline operating in Myanmar. Since its inception, MAI has had the privilege of working with various stakeholders to make air travel accessible and promote the overall socio-economic growth of the country. MAI, along with its sister carrier Mingalar (formerly known as Air KBZ), embarked on a new era of business realignment and strategic expansion following the takeover of both carriers by 24 Hour Group of Companies in 2019, led by Chairman U Aung Aung Zaw.

In 2019, MAI planned to double its fleet, resuming growth after several stagnant years focusing on enhancing its international reach, particularly in China and South Korea.

On March 8, 2024, Myanmar Airways International (MAI) held a ceremony at the Lotte Hotel in Yangon to unveil its 2024 strategic plans and rebrand its partner airline, Air KBZ, to Mingalar Aviation Services. MAI announced an expansion to 21 international flights, adding routes to Chiang Mai, Vientiane, Dhaka, and Doha. Additionally, MAI introduced a co-branded Tourism SIM with ATOM, offering affordable and high-quality phone services and data for passengers.

MAI operates from its hubs in Yangon and Mandalay, serving 41 destinations across Myanmar, Thailand, Singapore, Malaysia, China, India, United Arab Emirates, Cambodia, Vietnam, South Korea, Russia and Laos with a fleet of six A319s, two A320s and two ATRs, in collaboration with its sister carrier, Mingalar.

MAI's international partners include Air France Industries, Korean Air, Malaysia Airlines, Garuda Indonesia, and SriLankan Airlines. MAI is a member of the IATA Clearing House (ICH), IATA, and a partner of the MITA system. It is the first airline in Myanmar to receive the IATA Operational Safety Audit Program (IOSA) Operator title. MAI was named the "Most Admired ASEAN Enterprise" in Myanmar at the 2014 ASEAN Business Awards, hosted by the ASEAN Business Advisory Council (ASEAN-BAC). During the pandemic, MAI was recognised by significant governmental and industry organisations, including the Korean Ministry of Foreign Affairs Overseas Citizens Protection Division for continuous operations between both nations, and was named the 2022 Airline of the Year at the 6th Incheon Airport Awards by Seoul-Incheon International Airport, one of Skytrax's top 10 airports.

== Services ==
=== Sky Smile Privilege Program ===
In this frequent-flyer program, MAI offers three levels of membership – Jade, Ruby and Diamond. The validity of the program is divided into two parts, membership tiers and award mileage.

- Tier Points: Validity is two years based on an accumulated basis.
- Award Points: Validity is two years but on a rolling basis, based on actual accruals/redemptions.

Ruby Tier members can redeem miles for award tickets as per the program's terms and conditions. Mileage accrual and redemption are based on miles provided in the mileage calculator.

=== Sky Smile Executive Lounge ===
MAI Sky Smile Executive Lounge at Yangon International Airport is offered exclusively for Diamond Card Members and business class passengers. The lounge offers refreshments, entertainment and business secretary services.

== Destinations ==
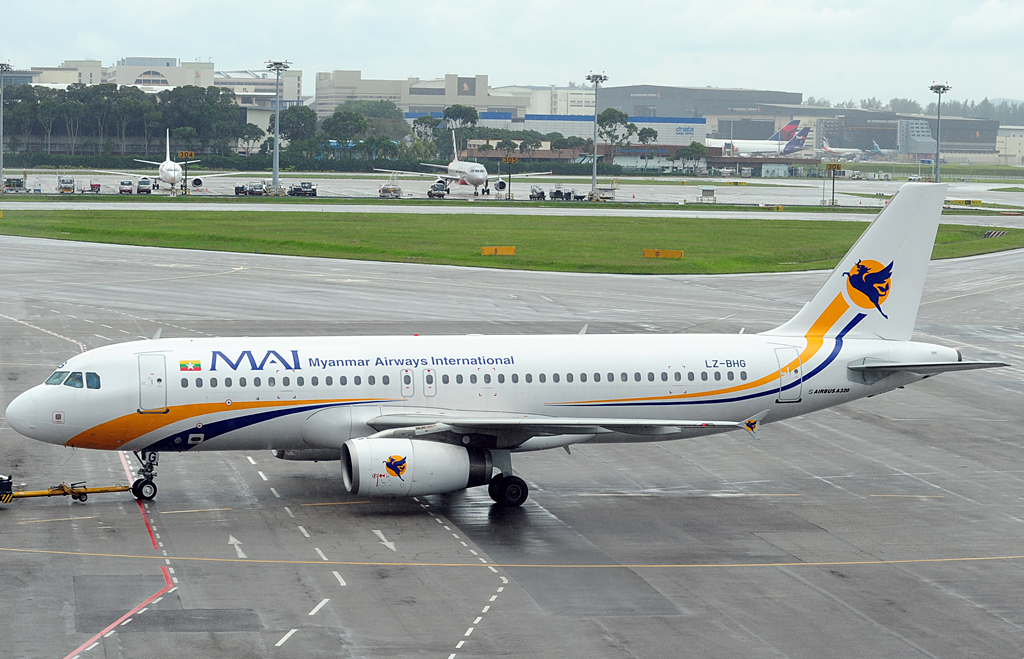
A Myanmar Airways International Airbus A320 at Changi Airport, Singapore

As of April 2025, Myanmar Airways International serves 11 domestic destinations and 18 international destinations in 12 countries:

| Country | City | Airport | Notes | Refs |
|---|---|---|---|---|
| Cambodia | Phnom Penh | Phnom Penh International Airport | Airport closed | |
| Cambodia | Phnom Penh | Techo International Airport | | |
| China | Guangzhou | Guangzhou Baiyun International Airport | | |
| India | Chennai | Chennai International Airport | | |
| India | Delhi | Indira Gandhi International Airport | | |
| India | Kolkata | Netaji Subhas Chandra Bose International Airport | | |
| Laos | Vientiane | Wattay International Airport | | |
| Malaysia | Kuala Lumpur | Kuala Lumpur International Airport | | |
| Malaysia | Penang | Penang International Airport | | |
| Myanmar | Dawei | Dawei Airport | | |
| Myanmar | Heho | Heho Airport | | |
| Myanmar | Kawthaung | Kawthaung Airport | | |
| Myanmar | Kengtung | Kengtung Airport | | |
| Myanmar | Loikaw | Loikaw Airport | | |
| Myanmar | Mandalay | Mandalay International Airport | Focus city | |
| Myanmar | Myeik | Myeik Airport | | |
| Myanmar | Myitkyina | Myitkyina Airport | | |
| Myanmar | Sittwe | Sittwe Airport | | |
| Myanmar | Yangon | Yangon International Airport | Hub | |
| Russia | Novosibirsk | Tolmachevo Airport | | |
| Singapore | Singapore | Changi Airport | | |
| South Korea | Seoul | Incheon International Airport | | |
| Thailand | Bangkok | Don Mueang International Airport | | |
| Thailand | Samut Prakan | Suvarnabhumi Airport | | |
| Thailand | Chiang Mai | Chiang Mai International Airport | | |
| United Arab Emirates | Dubai | Dubai International Airport | Suspended | |
| Vietnam | Da Nang | Da Nang International Airport | | |
| Vietnam | Hanoi | Noi Bai International Airport | | |
| Vietnam | Ho Chi Minh City | Tan Son Nhat International Airport | | |

=== Codeshare agreements ===
Myanmar Airways International has codeshare and interline partner agreements with the following airlines:

- Aeroflot
- Air Cambodia
- Air France
- Air India
- Air Niugini
- All Nippon Airways
- APG Airlines
- Asiana Airlines
- Bamboo Airways
- Bangkok Airways
- Biman Bangladesh Airlines
- China Airlines
- China Southern Airlines
- El Al
- Emirates
- Ethiopian Airlines
- Etihad Airlines
- EVA Air
- Gulf Air
- Hainan Airlines
- Himalaya Airlines
- Hong Kong Airlines
- Japan Airlines
- KLM
- Korean Air
- Kuwait Airways
- Lao Airlines
- Mahan Air
- Malaysia Airlines
- Mingalar Aviation Services
- Oman Air
- Qantas
- Qatar Airways
- Royal Brunei Airlines
- Shenzhen Airlines
- SriLankan Airlines
- Thai Airways International
- Turkish Airlines
- Vietnam Airlines

This may not be included, but Myanmar Airways International also operate flight to Tachileik with its ATR 72-600 plane.

== Fleet ==
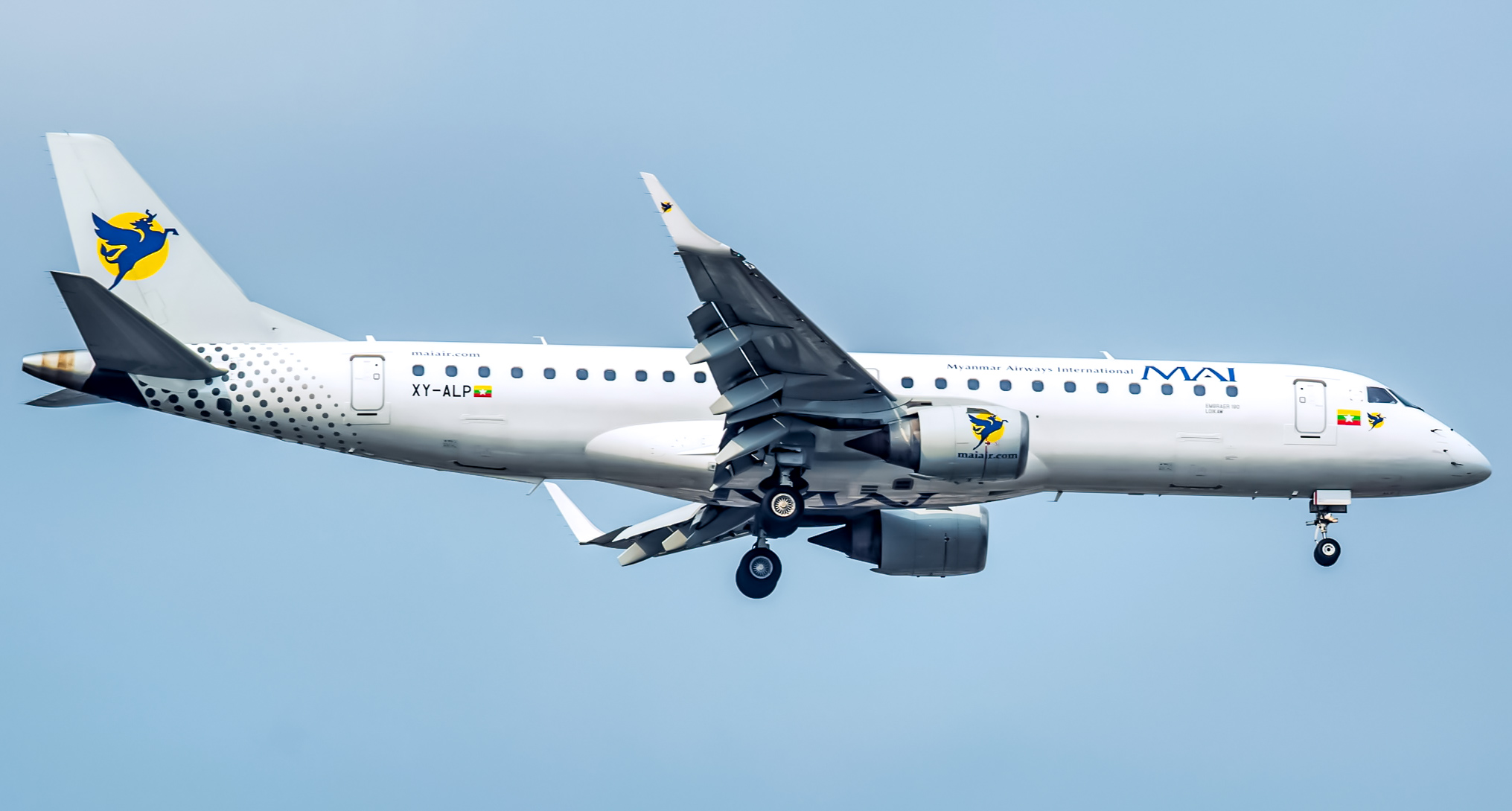
MAI Embraer 190

=== Current fleet ===
As of April 2025, Myanmar Airways International operates the following aircraft:

Myanmar Airways International fleet
| Aircraft | In service | Orders | Passengers | Notes |
|---|---|---|---|---|
| Airbus A319-100 | 6 | — | 140 | |
| Airbus A320-200 | 2 | — | 170 | |
| ATR 72-600 | 2 | — | 68 | |
| Embraer E190 | 1 | — | 98 | |
Cargo
| Airbus A321-200PCF | 1 | — | Cargo | Leased from Royal Air Philippines. |
| Boeing 737-400F | 1 | — | Cargo | |
| Total | 13 | 0 | | |

== See also ==
- List of airlines of Myanmar
