= Pathein Airport =

- IATA: BSX; ICAO: VYPN

Summary
- Location: Pathein, Myanmar
- Elevation AMSL: 13 ft / 4 m
- Coordinates: 16°48′55″N 094°46′48″E

Map
- Location of airport in Myanmar

Runways
Direction	Length		Surface
Direction	ft	m	Surface
06/24	4,400	1,341	Concrete

Pathein Airport (IATA: BSX, ICAO: VYPN) is an airport in Pathein, Myanmar. It has one runway.

== Airlines and destinations ==
Airlines	Destinations
Myanmar National Airlines	Sittwe, Yangon
