= Mann Yadanarpon Airlines =

Myanma airline

IATA	ICAO	Call sign
7Y	MYP	MANN ROYAL
- Founded: July 2013; 13 years ago
- Commenced operations: February 2014; 12 years ago
- Operating bases: Mandalay International Airport
- Frequent-flyer program: Royal Service
- Fleet size: 3
- Destinations: 9
- Headquarters: Yangon, Myanmar
- Key people: Lin Myat Tun (MD), Ohn Myint (CEO)
- Website: www.airmyp.com

Mann Yadanarpon Airlines Company Limited (Burmese: မန်းရတနာပုံ လေကြောင်း) is a privately owned domestic airline based in Yangon, Myanmar. The airline began operations in February 2014. The airline also offers charter services and is planning to commence regional international services to Thailand.

== Destinations ==
As of January 2024, Mann Yadanarpon Airlines serves the following destinations, all of which are within Myanmar:

Country	City	Airport	Notes	Refs
Myanmar	Dawei	Dawei Airport		
Myanmar	Heho	Heho Airport		
Myanmar	Lashio	Lashio Airport		
Myanmar	Loikaw	Loikaw Airport		
Myanmar	Mandalay	Mandalay International Airport	Hub	
Myanmar	Myitkyina	Myitkyina Airport		
Myanmar	Sittwe	Sittwe Airport		
Myanmar	Tachileik	Tachileik Airport		
Myanmar	Thandwe	Thandwe Airport	Seasonal	
Myanmar	Yangon	Yangon International Airport	Hub	

=== Codeshare agreements ===
Mann Yadanarpon Airlines has codeshare agreements with the following airlines:

- Myanmar National Airlines

== Fleet ==
=== Current fleet ===
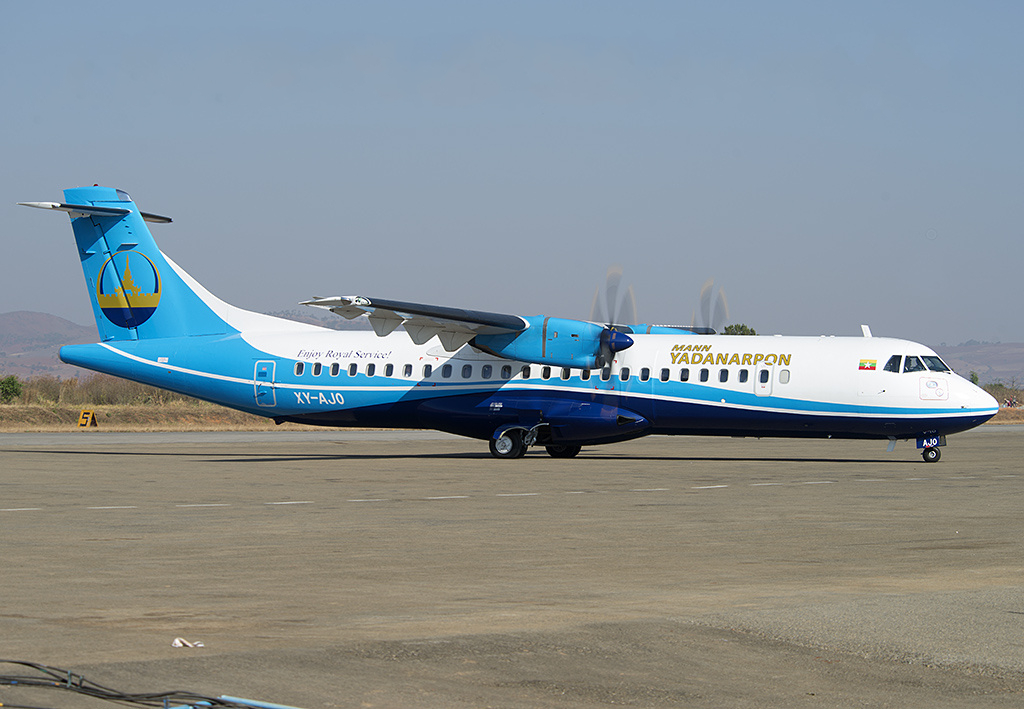
A Mann Yadanarpon Airlines ATR 72-600

As of August 2025, Mann Yadanarpon Airlines operates the following aircraft:

Mann Yadanarpon Airlines fleet
Aircraft	In Fleet	Orders	Notes
ATR 72-600	3	10	
Total	3	10	
