= Myitkyina Airport =

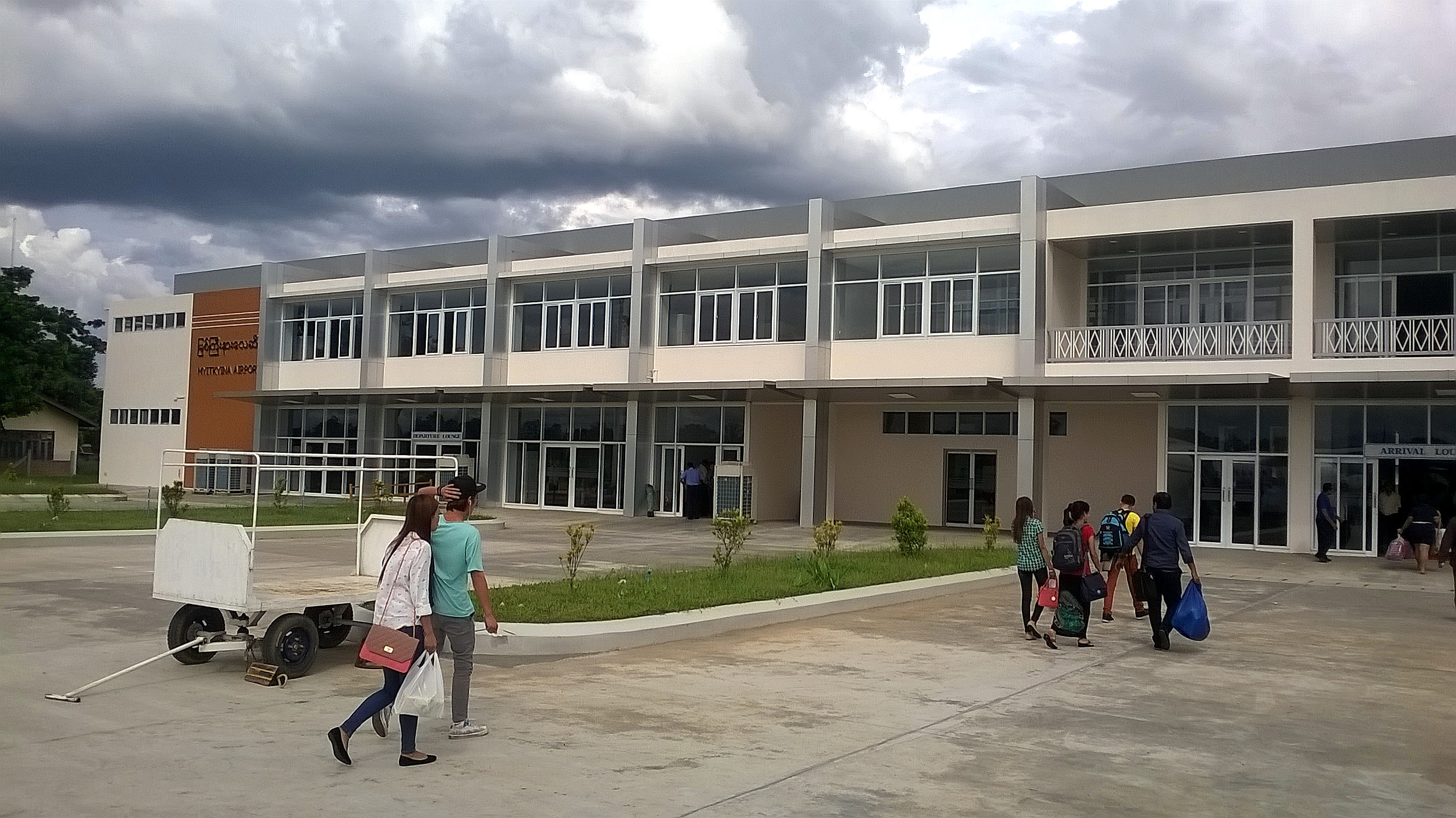
- IATA: MYT; ICAO: VYMK

Summary
- Airport type: Public
- Serves: Myitkyina
- Location: Myitkyina, Myanmar
- Elevation AMSL: 174.5 m / 484 ft
- Coordinates: 25°23′1.09″N 097°21′06.91″E

Map
- Location of airport in Myanmar

Runways
Direction	Length		Surface
Direction	m	ft	Surface
04/22	1,859	6,100	Asphalt

Myitkyina Airport is a public airport in Myitkyina, Myanmar (IATA: MYT, ICAO: VYMK).

== Airlines and destinations ==
Airlines	Destinations
Air Thanlwin	Mandalay, Putao, Yangon
Mann Yatanarpon Airlines	Mandalay, Yangon
Mingalar Aviation Services	Mandalay, Putao, Yangon
Myanmar Airways International	Mandalay, Putao, Yangon
Myanmar National Airlines	Mandalay, Putao, Yangon

== History ==
Built before World War II as Myitkyina Airfield, the airfield was captured by the Imperial Japanese Army on 8 May 1942 during the Japanese conquest of Burma. During the occupation, it was used by the Japanese Air Force as a fighter base, attacking Allied aircraft flying "the Hump" transport supply missions between India and China.

The airfield was attacked on numerous missions by Tenth Air Force and Royal Air Force fighter and bombers until it was captured by Merrill's Marauders (officially named the 6th Ranger Battalion-5307th Composite Unit (provisional)) on 17 May 1944, but fighting continued in Myitkyina town until August 1944.

Once in Allied hands, the 3d Combat Cargo Group moved in with C-47 Skytrains and used Myitkyina as a combat resupply airfield, air-dropping pallets of supplies and ammunition to the advancing Allied forces on the ground. In January 1945, the 80th Fighter Group flew P-47 Thunderbolts from the field until 24 May 1945. The 1st Combat Cargo Group then moved in with C-47s and remained until August when elements of the 4th Combat Cargo Group replaced them. The 4th CCG operated supply and passenger flights between the airfield and China until December 1945 when American forces pulled out of the area.
