= Kengtung Airport =

Airport in Kengtung, Myanmar

Kyaing Tong Airport ကျိုင်းတုံလေဆိပ်
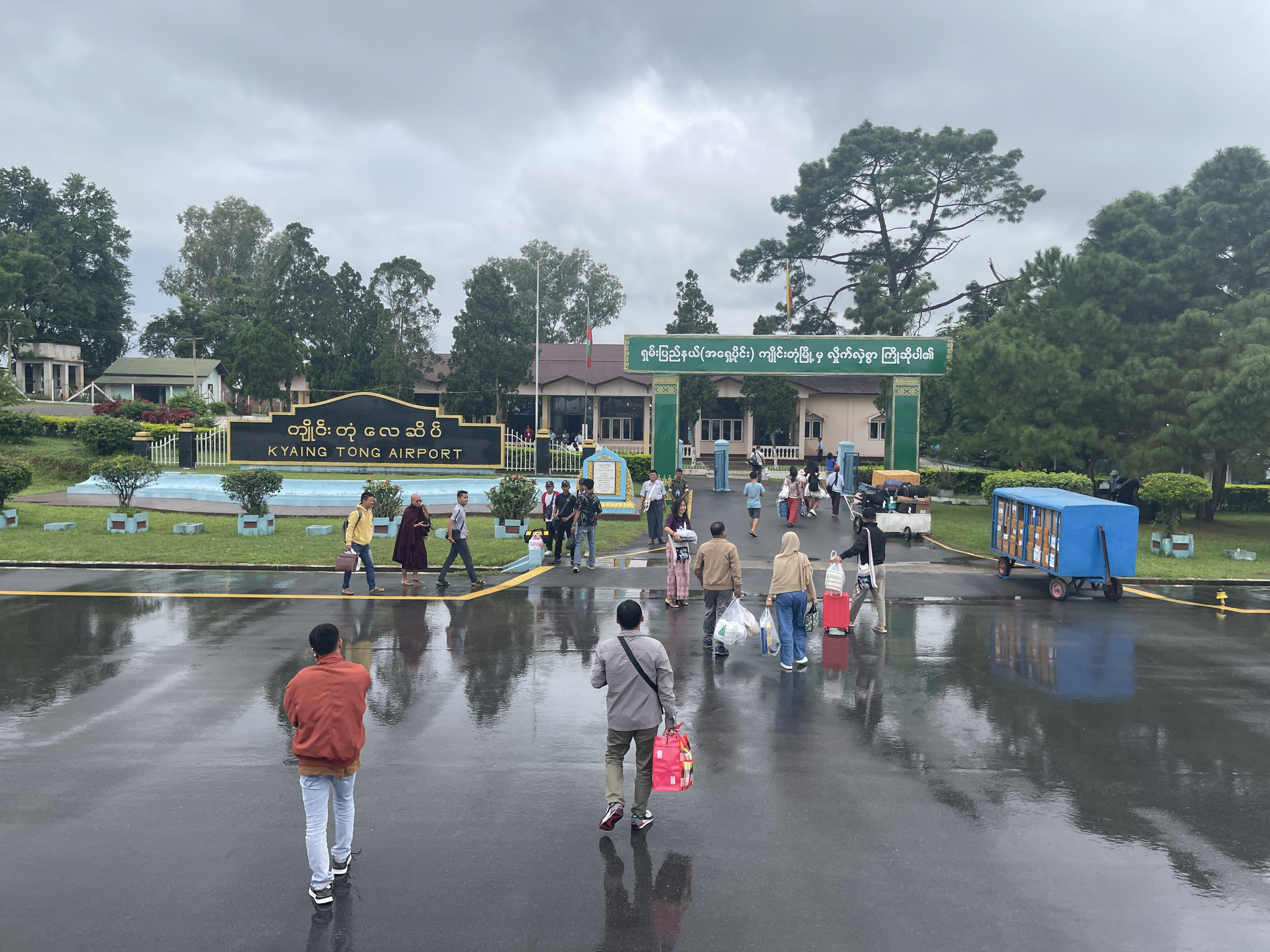
- IATA: KET; ICAO: VYKG

Summary
- Location: Kengtung, Myanmar
- Elevation AMSL: 2,705 ft / 824 m
- Coordinates: 21°18′06″N 099°38′10″E

Map
- Location of airport in Myanmar

Runways
| Direction | Length | | Surface |
| Direction | ft | m | Surface |
|---|---|---|---|
| 12/30 | 7,815 | 2,382 | Asphalt |

Kengtung Airport is an airport in Kengtung, Shan State, Myanmar (IATA: KET, ICAO: VYKG).

== Airlines and destinations ==
| Airlines | Destinations |
|---|---|
| Myanmar Airways International | Heho, Mandalay |
| Myanmar National Airlines | Heho, Mandalay |
