= Nyaung U Airport =

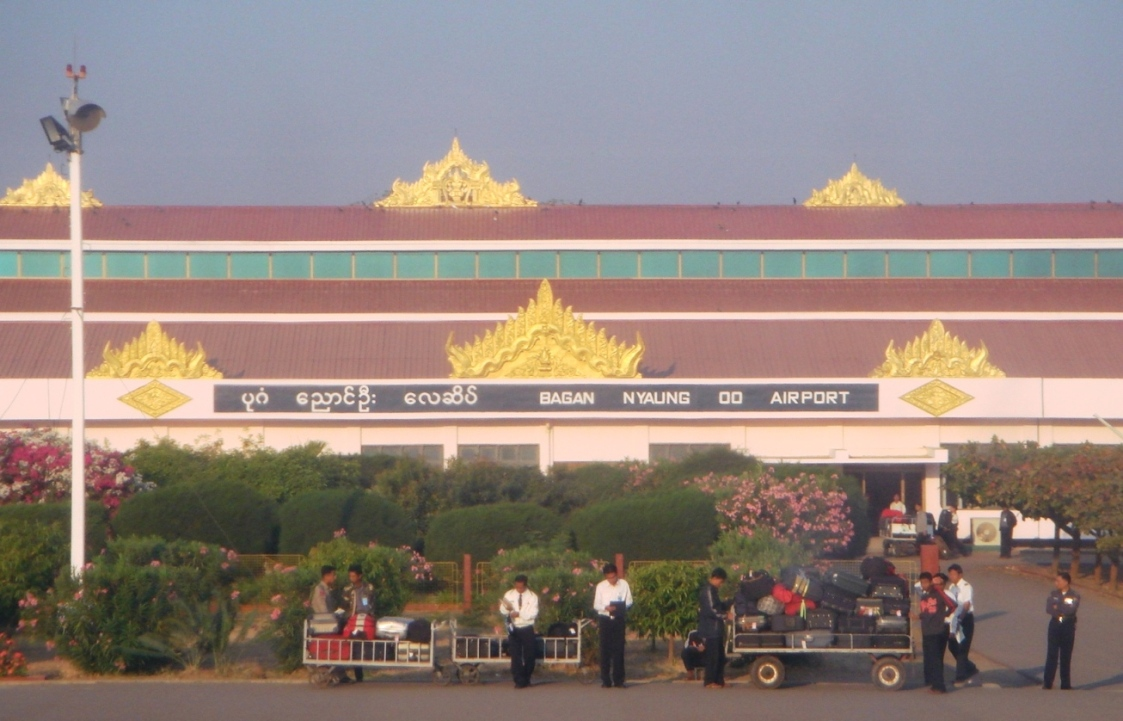
- Bagan Nyaung Oo Airport, February 2009
- IATA: NYU; ICAO: VYBG

Summary
- Airport type: Public
- Operator: Government
- Serves: Bagan, Myanmar
- Location: Nyaung U (Nyaung Oo)
- Elevation AMSL: 312 ft (95 m)
- Coordinates: 21°10′44″N 094°55′49″E

Map
- Location of airport in Myanmar

Runways
Direction	Length		Surface
Direction	m	ft	Surface
18/36	2,591	8,500	Asphalt

Nyaung U Airport (Burmese: ပုဂံညောင်‌ဦးလေဆိပ်) (IATA: NYU, ICAO: VYBG), also known as Bagan Nyaung Oo Airport, is an airport located in Nyaung-U (or Nyaung Oo), a town in the Mandalay Region, Myanmar. It is the primary air gateway to the ancient sites of Bagan and surrounding areas. It has one asphalt runway measuring 2,591 metres (8,500 ft).

== History ==
On 11 December 2019, the President's Office announced that Nyaung U Airport (Bagan) had been designated as Myanmar's fourth international airport. The designation was intended to promote tourism to Bagan following its inscription as a UNESCO World Heritage Site. The government established a direct air route between Nyaung U Airport and Siem Reap International Airport in Cambodia.

During that time, ATR 72 and Embraer 190 aircraft were permitted to operate at Nyaung U Airport. Following its designation as an international airport, the Department of Civil Aviation announced that international passenger aircraft up to the size of the Airbus A320 would be permitted to use the airport.

According to a 2020 government source, the airport handled between 400 and 600 domestic and international passengers each day.

As Bagan is a major tourist destination and a UNESCO World Heritage Site, Nyaung U Airport has become one of Myanmar's busiest airports, serving both domestic and international visitors.

Nyaung U Airport suffered damage in the 2025 Myanmar earthquake and had undergone upgrades by June 2026.

In Dec 2025, expansion works were carried out at Nyaung U Airport, including widening both sides of the runway by 25 feet (7.6 m), resurfacing the runway and existing taxiway with asphalt concrete, and expanding the aircraft parking apron.

== Facilities ==
The airport is at an elevation of 312 feet (95 m) above mean sea level. It has one runway designated 18/36 with an asphalt surface measuring 2,591 by 30 metres (8,501 ft × 98 ft).
