= Sittwe Airport =

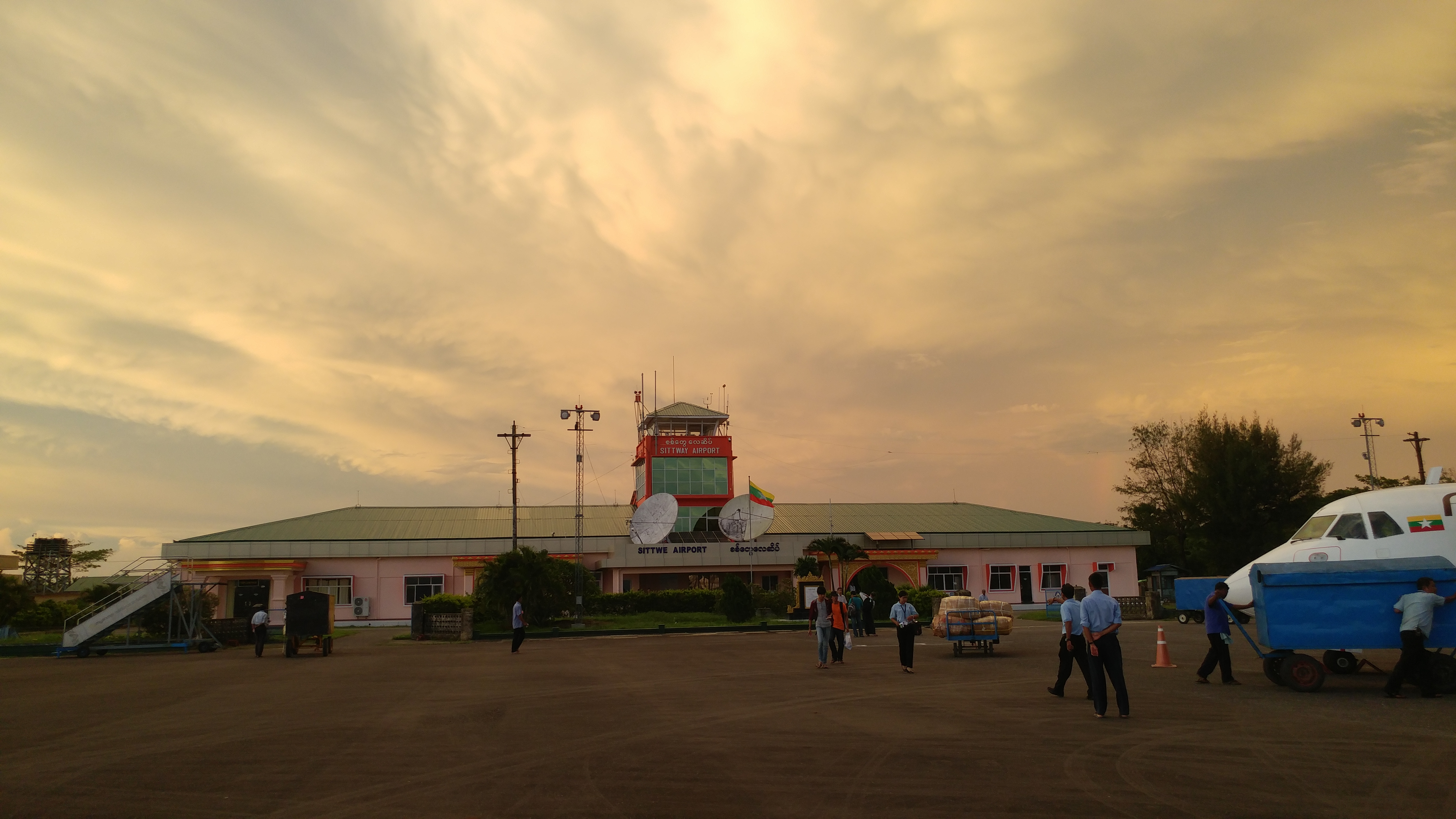
- IATA: AKY; ICAO: VYSW

Summary
- Location: Sittwe, Rakhine State, Myanmar
- Elevation AMSL: 39 ft / 12 m
- Coordinates: 20°07′58″N 092°52′21″E

Map
- Location of airport in Myanmar

Runways
Direction	Length		Surface
Direction	ft	m	Surface
11/29	6,001	1,829	Bitumen

Sittwe Airport (IATA: AKY, ICAO: VYSW) is an airport in Sittwe, Rakhine State, Myanmar. In Burmese it is known as စစ်တွေ လေဆိပ်.

It started as Royal Air Force station RAF Akyab, (Note: during colonial rule, Sittwe was known as 'Akyab') a military airfield in World War II. It was handed over to Department of Civil Aviation by International Aero Limited Company on 24 July 1947. It was upgraded to 1,829 metres (6,000 ft) long and 43 metres (140 ft) wide gravel mixed asphalt runway in 1960. The airport building was extended to 67 by 18 metres (220 by 60 ft) from 37 by 18 metres (120 by 60 ft) and it was opened on 22 March 2002. 4 feet thick asphalt concrete layer was placed on the 1,829-by-46-metre (6,000 ft × 150 ft) runway, the 160-by-23-metre (525 ft × 75 ft) taxiway and the 183-by-91-metre (600 ft × 300 ft) apron and opened on 20 May 2009 for use of F-28 jets.

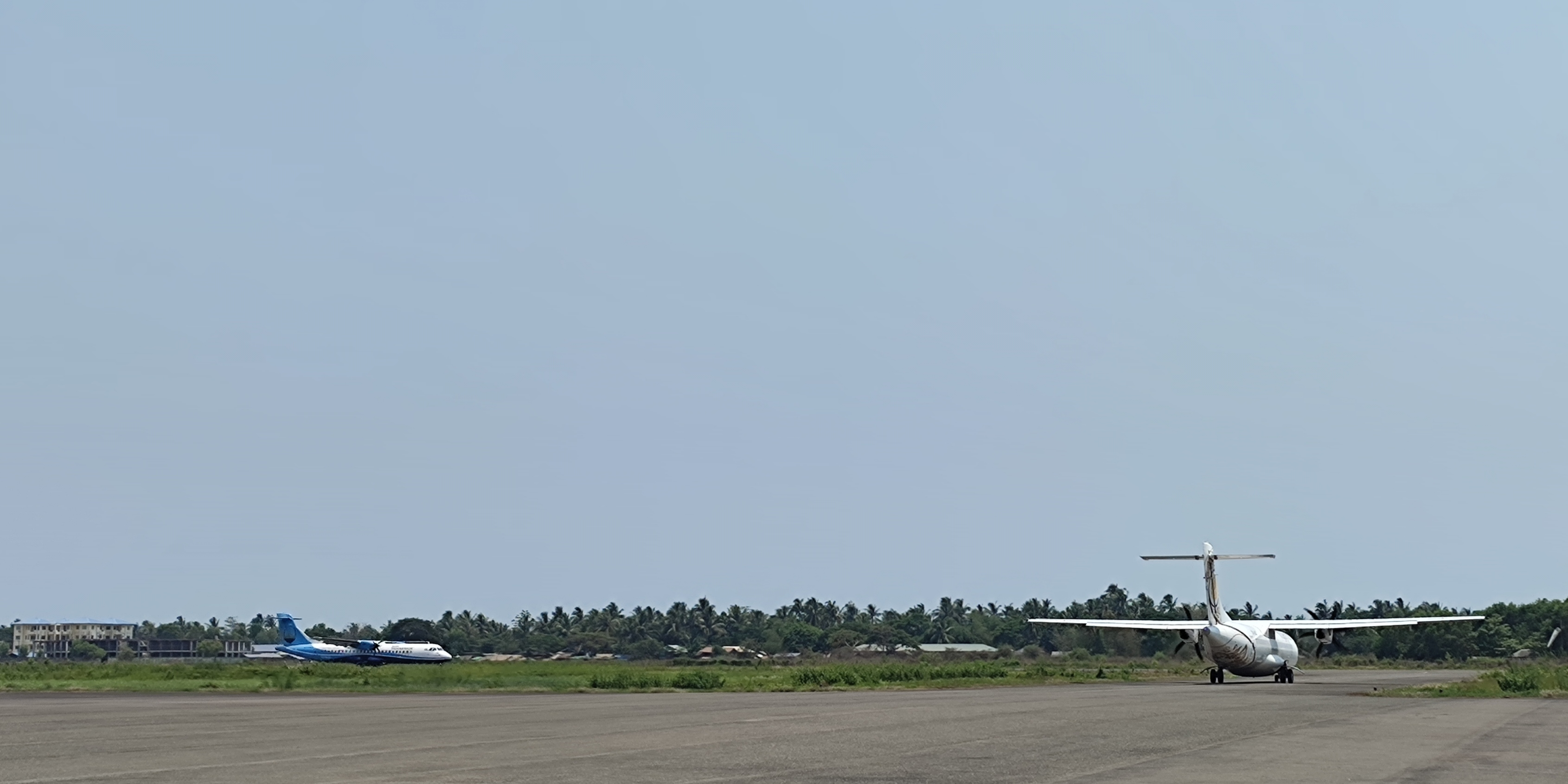

It is equipped with HF, VHF, NDB, Night Landing Facilities such as airfield lighting, approach light and remote control air ground machines. It admits over 90,000 passengers in 2010-11 and it is expected to accommodate 150,000 passengers for arrival and departure yearly.

In early 2024 it was reported that conscription-age passengers arriving at this airport were interrogated by members of the Tatmadaw, with some being taken to a nearby military base to begin their period of conscripted service in the forces of the military junta due to the country's civil war.

== Airlines and destinations ==
Airlines	Destinations
Mann Yatanarpon Airlines	Yangon
Mingalar Aviation Services	Yangon
Myanmar National Airlines	Kyaukpyu, Naypyidaw, Pathein, Yangon

== Accidents and incidents ==
- On 24 August 1972, Vickers Viscount XY-ADF of Union of Burma Airways was damaged beyond economic repair when it ran off the runway after landing 450 feet past the designated threshold and the undercarriage collapsed as the aircraft skidded for some 1,250 feet.
