= 1987 Burma Airways Fokker F27 crash =

1987 Burma Airways Fokker F27 crash could refer to:

- June 1987 Burma Airways Fokker F27 crash
- October 1987 Burma Airways Fokker F27 crash
