= Pakistan International Airlines Flight 631 =

1972 aviation accident in Pakistan

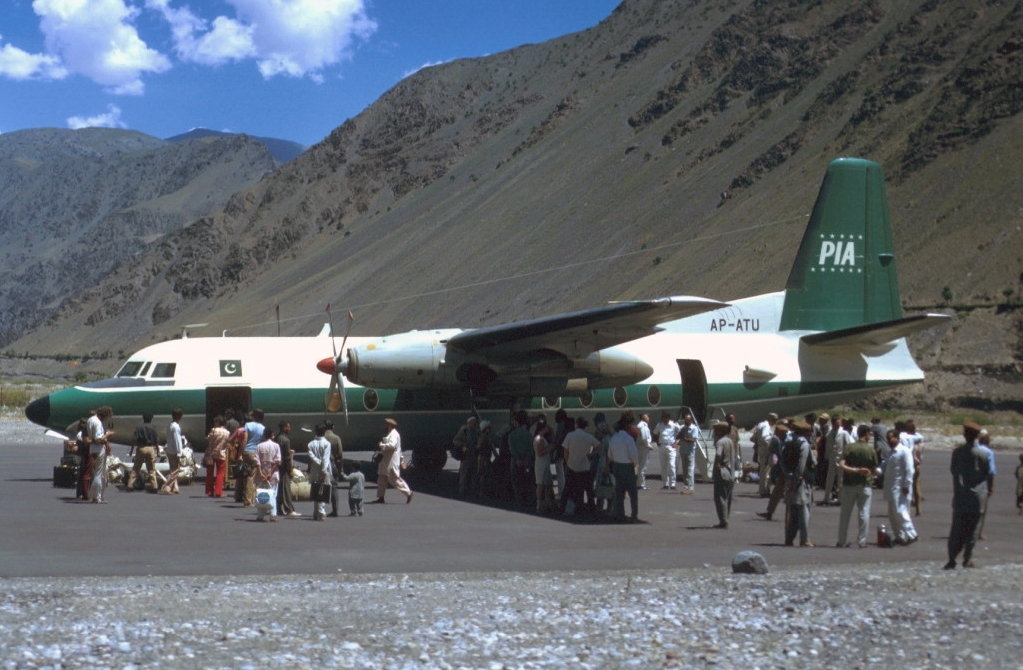
- A Pakistan International Airlines Fokker F-27 Friendship, similar to the one involved

Accident
- Date: December 8, 1972
- Summary: Controlled flight into terrain
- Site: Jalkot, Pakistan

Aircraft
- Aircraft type: Fokker F-27 Friendship 600
- Operator: Pakistan International Airlines
- Registration: AP-AUS
- Flight origin: Gilgit Airport
- Destination: Benazir Bhutto International Airport
- Passengers: 22 or 28
- Crew: 4 or 5
- Fatalities: 26 or 32
- Survivors: 0

Pakistan International Airlines Flight 631 was a domestic scheduled passenger flight on 8 December 1972 operated by the Pakistan International Airlines that took off from Gilgit Airport in Gilgit, Pakistan, bound for Rawalpindi International Airport in Rawalpindi. The involved aircraft was a Fokker F-27. The aircraft crashed in mountainous terrain killing all people on board.

The crash took place on the same day as Ethiopian Airlines Flight 708 and United Air Lines Flight 553.

== Flight, search and recovery ==
In the evening of 8 December 1972, the Pakistan International Airlines operated Fokker F-27 departed at 11:40am from Gilgit Airport in Gilgit, Pakistan, bound for Rawalpindi International Airport in Rawalpindi where it was scheduled to arrive at 12:50pm. There were rainy conditions during the flight. The aircraft lost radio contact halfway after 125 miles with Rawalpindi.

After the aircraft did not arrive during the evening of 8 December 1972, the airplane was reported missing by Pakistan International Airlines. A search operation was started with two C-130 transports and two helicopters. They were not able to find the aircraft and stopped when visibility became low, with ground searching continuing. There was hope the Fokker had made an emergency landing at Chilas, but the wreck was found the next day on Saturday 9 December. The aircraft had struck a snow-covered 9000 feet high mountain at the foot of the Himalayas near the village of Maidan around 8 miles south of Jalkot. All people on board were killed.

The bodies from the airplane were recovered by soldiers of the Pakistan Army.

== Aircraft ==
The involved aircraft was a Pakistan International Airlines owned Fokker F-27 Friendship 600 with registration number AP-AUS and MSN 10314. The aircraft had made its first flight on 2 December 1966 and had since made 11077 total airframe hours and 16720 cycles.

== Casualties ==
There is a difference between sources about the number of people on board. Aviation Safety Networks lists 26 people (22 passengers and four crew members), newspaper sources list 33 people (28 passengers and five crew members). The News states there were at least 31 people. There were no survivors.

The five crew members consisted of two cockpit crew including captain Javedullah, two cabin crew and one air guard.
