= Flight 404 =

Flight 404 may refer to:

- Japan Airlines Flight 404, which was hijacked by a group of 5 terrorists on 20 July 1973, led by Osamu Maruoka
- Pakistan International Airlines Flight 404, which was thought to have been crashed somewhere in the Himalayas on 25 August 1985; however, no wreckage was found
- Alitalia Flight 404, which crashed into Stadlerberg Mountain on 14 November 1990, due to an argument between the Captain and First Officer over whether to go around, and due to NAV and GPWS failures
