= Philippine Air Lines Flight 385 =

1967 aviation incident in the Philippines

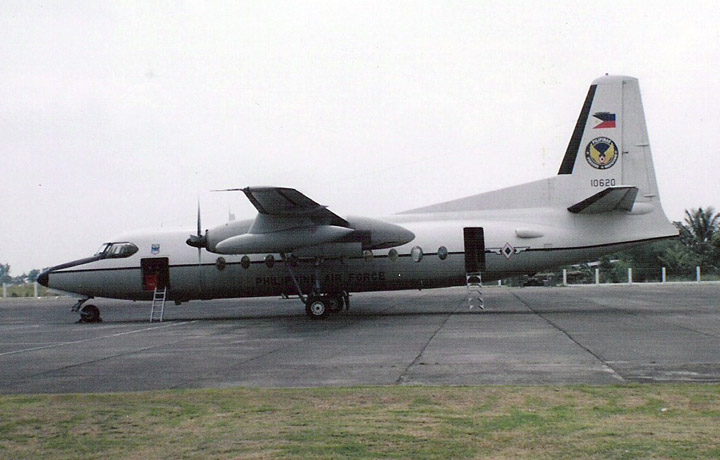
- A Philippine F-27, similar to the accident aircraft

Accident
- Date: July 6, 1967
- Summary: Controlled flight into terrain in bad weather
- Site: Mount Kanlaon, Negros Occidental, Philippines

Aircraft
- Aircraft type: Fokker F-27 Friendship 100
- Operator: Philippine Air Lines
- Registration: PI-C527
- Flight origin: Bacolod City Domestic Airport, Bacolod, Philippines
- Destination: Mactan–Cebu International Airport, Cebu, Philippines
- Passengers: 17
- Crew: 4
- Fatalities: 21
- Survivors: 0

Philippine Airlines Flight 385 was a domestic flight operated by Philippine Air Lines that crashed en route to Mactan–Cebu International Airport, Cebu, on July 6, 1967.

On July 6, 1967, the flight departed from Bacolod at 18:33 PHT flying to Mactan. 10 minutes later, while cruising in poor weather conditions with low visibility, the aircraft struck the slopes of Mount Kanlaon, 34 km southeast of Bacolod Airport, killing everyone on board.

== Aircraft ==
The aircraft was a Fokker F27 Friendship manufactured in November 1965 (c/n 10285) and was registered as PH-FIC before being delivered to Philippine Air Lines two weeks later and re-registered as PI-C527.

== Cause ==
The probable cause was determined to be controlled flight into terrain. The crew were flying under visual flight rules in poor weather conditions with low clouds and visibility requiring a flight under instruments.
