= Gilgit Airport =

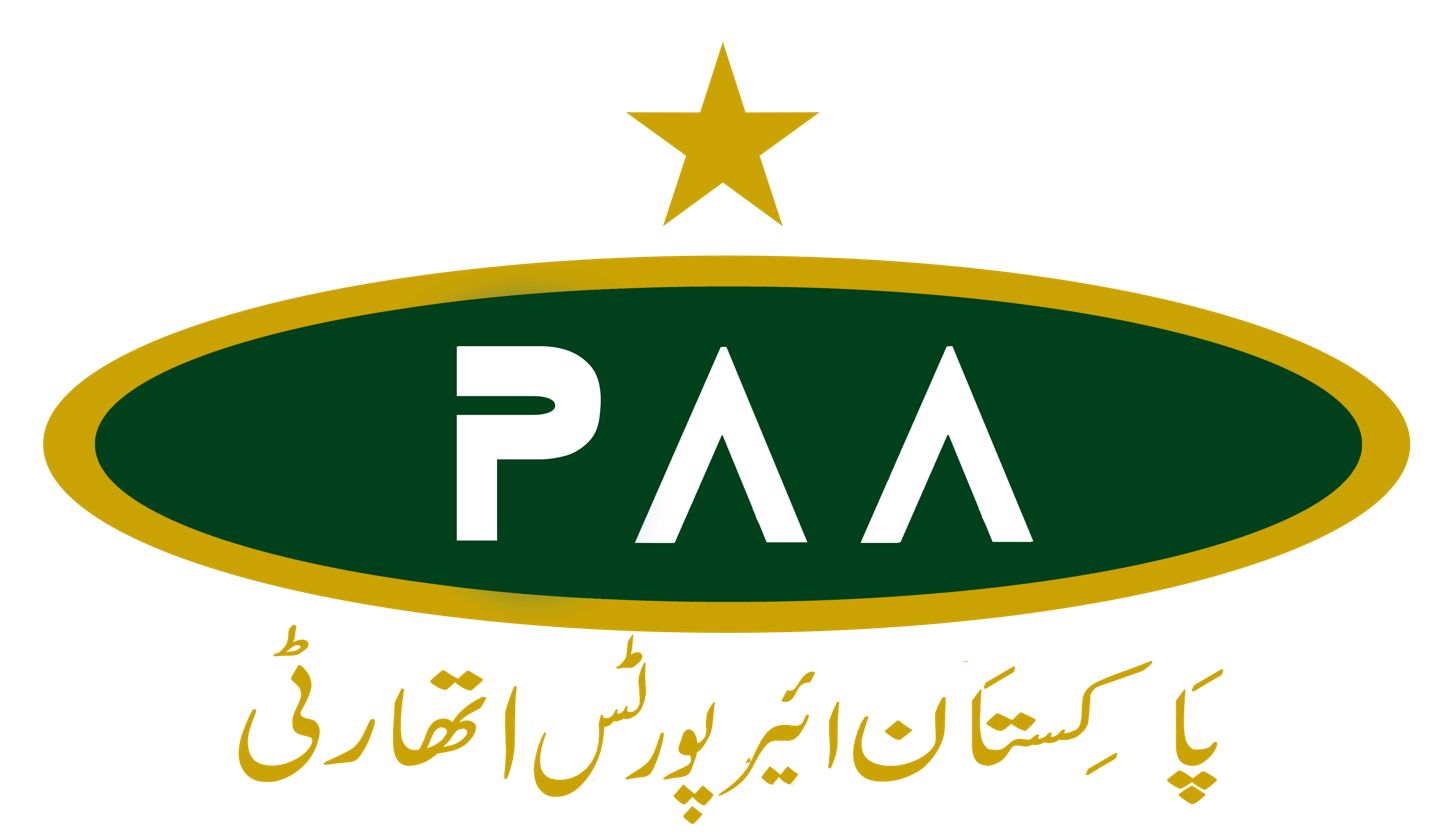
Gilgit Airport گلگت ہوائی اڈا

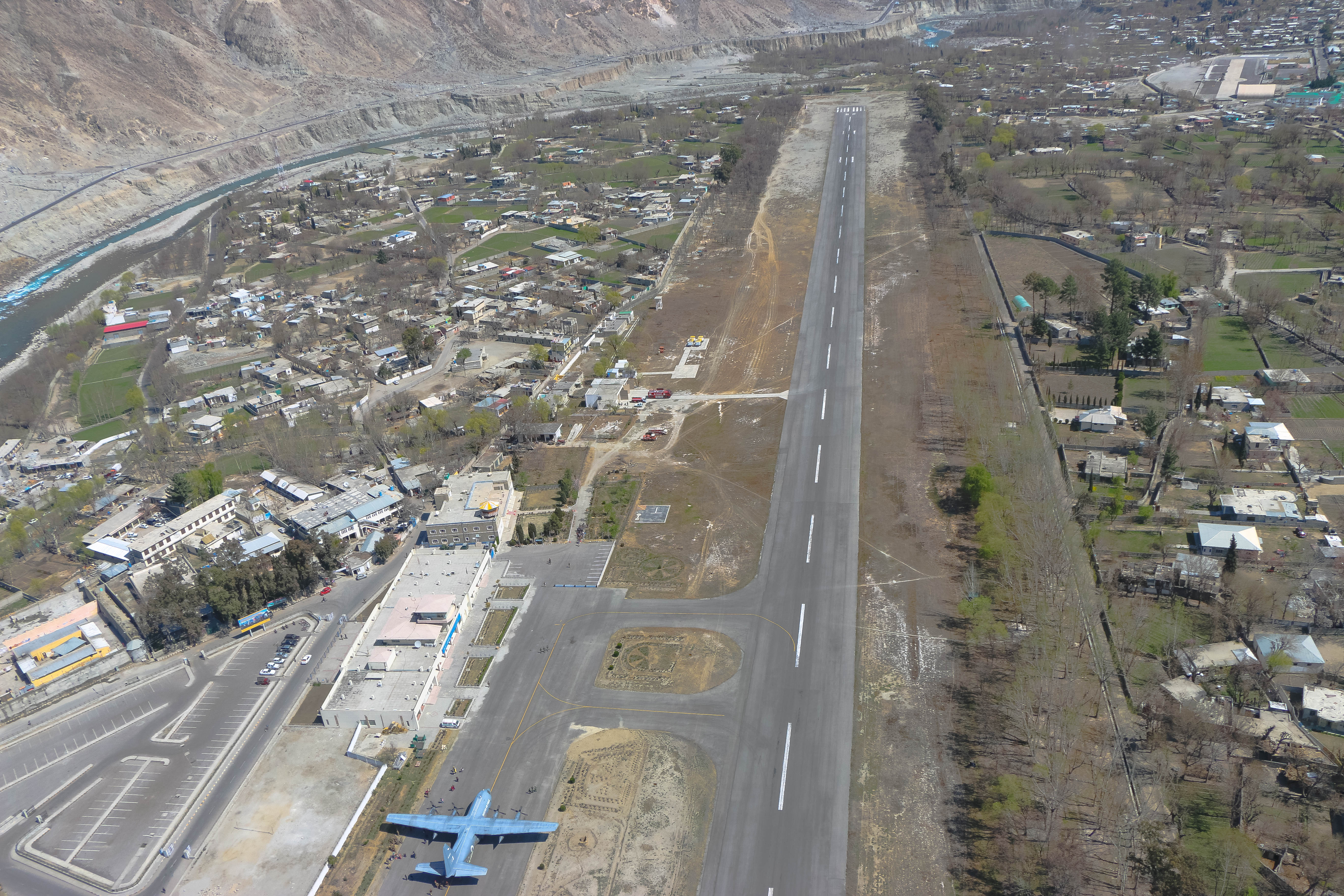
- Gilgit Airport in 2015.
- IATA: GIL; ICAO: OPGT

Summary
- Airport type: Public
- Owner: GoP Aviation Division
- Operator: Pakistan Airports Authority
- Serves: Gilgit-15100
- Location: Gilgit District, Gilgit Division, Gilgit Baltistan, Pakistan
- Elevation AMSL: 4,796 ft / 1,462 m
- Coordinates: 35°55′07″N 74°20′01″E
- Website: paa.gov.pk

Map
- Location of airport in Pakistan OPGT (Pakistan) OPGT (South Asia)

Runways
Direction	Length		Surface
Direction	ft	m	Surface
07/25	5,400	1,646	Bitumen

Statistics (July 2024 – June 2025)
- Passengers: 31,230 ▼12.15%
- Aircraft movements: 827 ▼21.53%
- Cargo: 14 metric tons ▲180%
- Source: Statistics from the Pakistan Civil Aviation Authority

Gilgit Airport (IATA: GIL, ICAO: OPGT) is a small domestic airport situated 1.25 nm (2.3 km) east of Gilgit, a city in the Gilgit-Baltistan territory of Pakistan. The city of Gilgit is one of the two major hubs for mountaineering expeditions in the northern areas of Pakistan.

== Structure ==
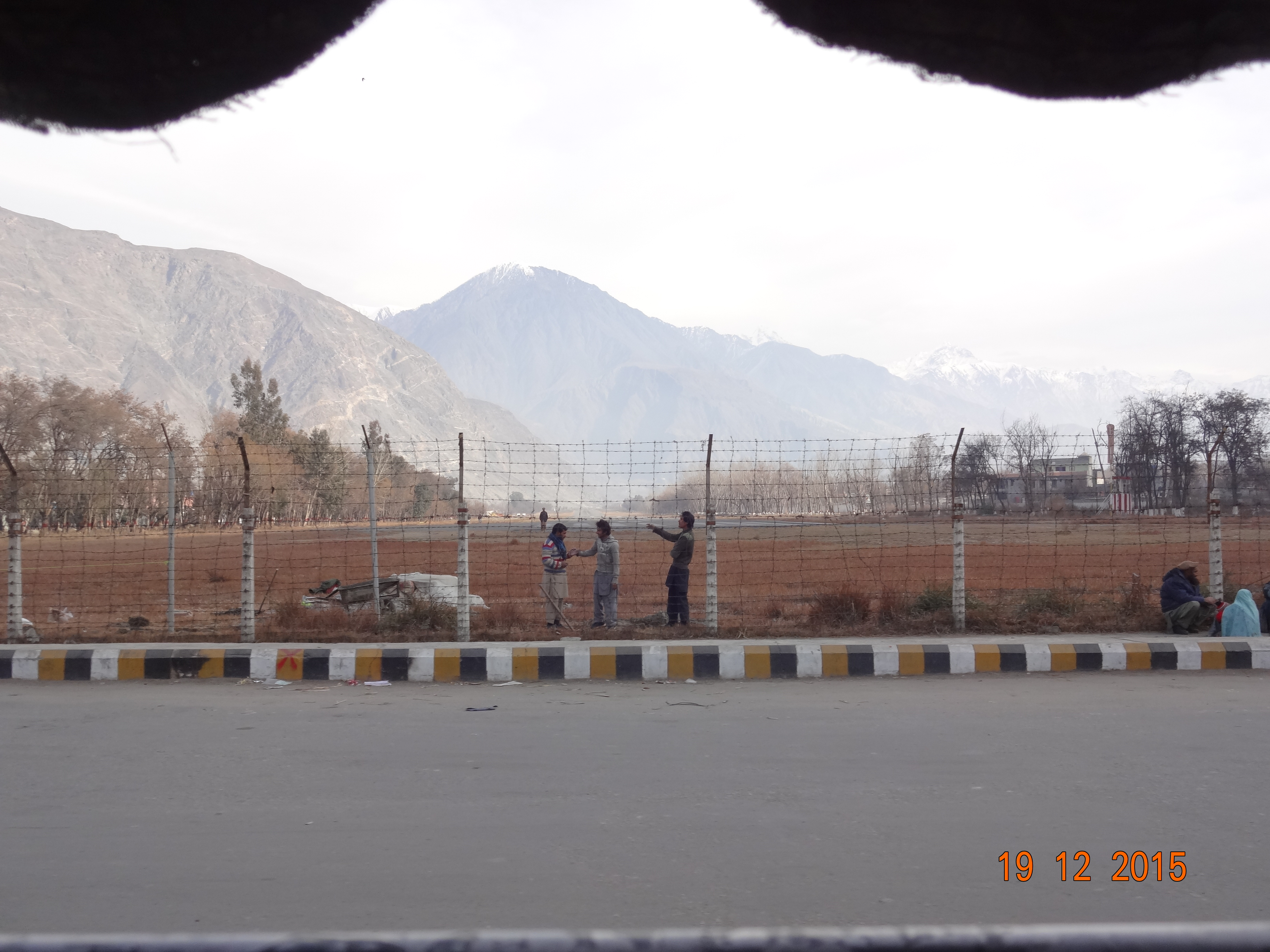
Gilgit Airport in December 2015

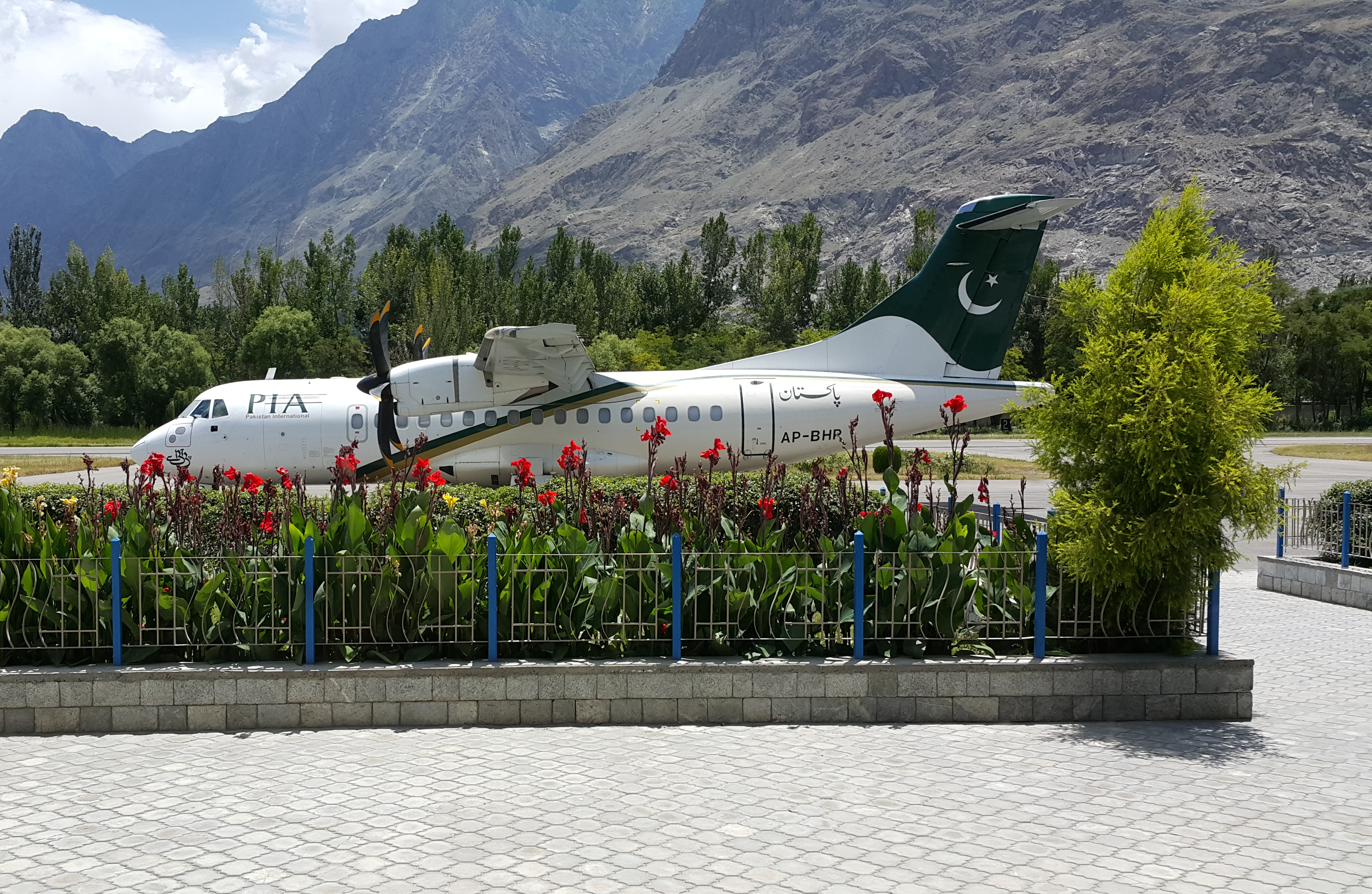
ATR 42-500 at Gilgit Airport in July 2016

Because of the location of the runway in the Gilgit valley, larger aircraft can not operate at the airport. The airport has a 5,400ft long runway 07/25 but it is not aligned with the length of the valley that makes it hard for take offs or landings from both sides. Very rarely aircraft land or take from the CAA park side of the runway. Pakistan International Airlines currently operates ATR 42 aircraft on the Gilgit-Islamabad route. In the past, Fokker F-27 Friendships were used. Other aircraft that operate at the airport include the military Lockheed C-130 Hercules. In the event of a diversion or aborted landing due to bad weather, inbound aircraft typically return to Islamabad, so care must be taken to carry enough fuel for the round trip.

A new terminal was constructed in 2014 and inaugurated by Prime Minister Nawaz Sharif.

The airport was planned to be twice as extensive, but waterlogged ground led to half the allocated land being used for a public park, CAA Park or City Park Gilgit.

== History ==
Gilgit historically received aircraft before partition of the Indian subcontinent. Even today almost the same route is used by the pilots to reach Gilgit airport. Weather condition and good visibility is a must for Gilgit-Islamabad flight operations.

The airport was originally constructed in 1949, It was later upgraded in 1958 with pavement.

== Airlines and destinations ==
Due to the small size of the airport, smaller aircraft mostly turboprops like ATR-42 and C-130 are able to safely land and take off from this airport. Flights are scheduled mostly from Islamabad. However, in 2022, PIA started flights from Karachi and Lahore through a stopover at Islamabad.

Airlines	Destinations
Pakistan International Airlines	Islamabad

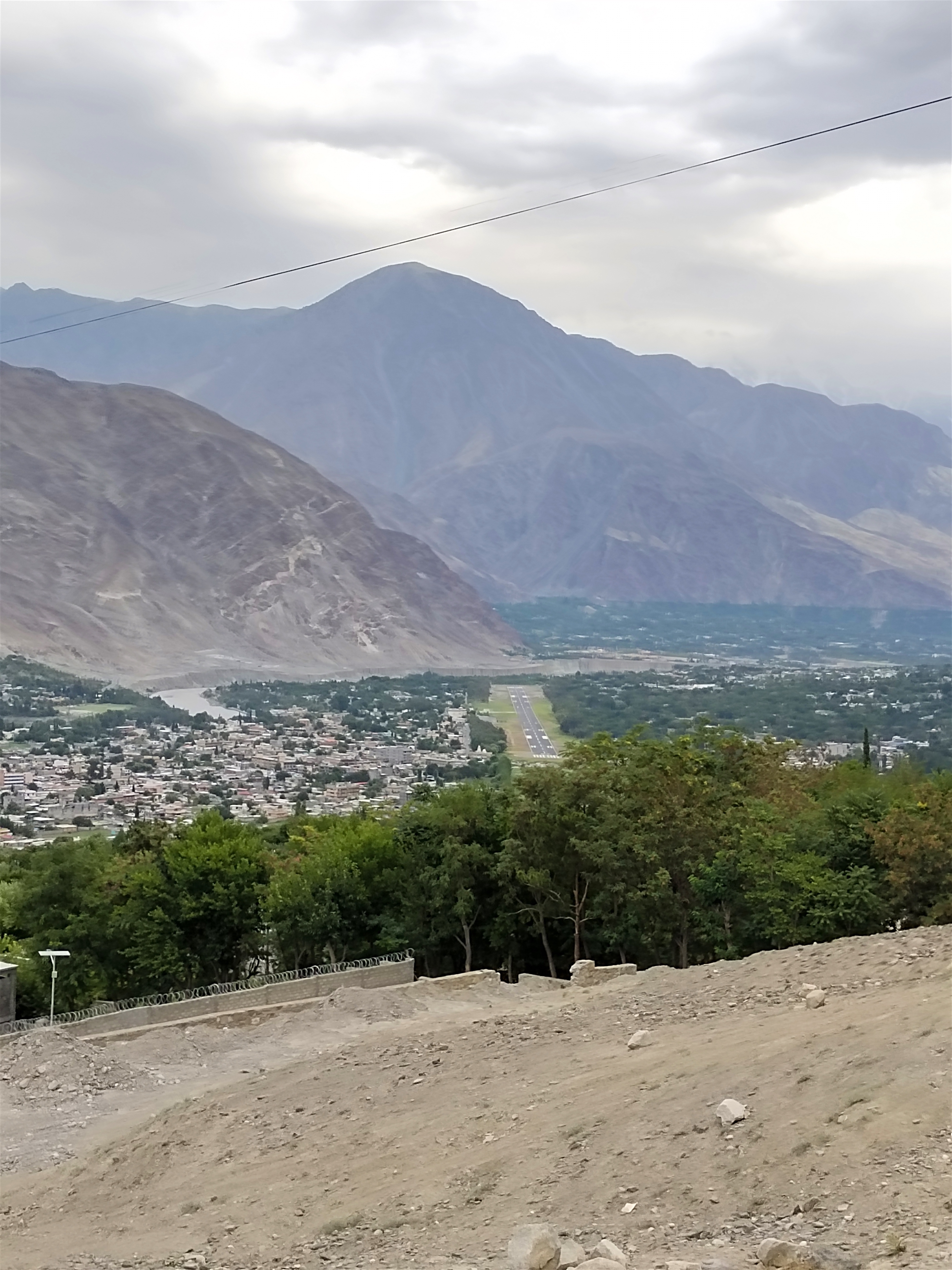
View from Barmus Valley

== Accidents ==
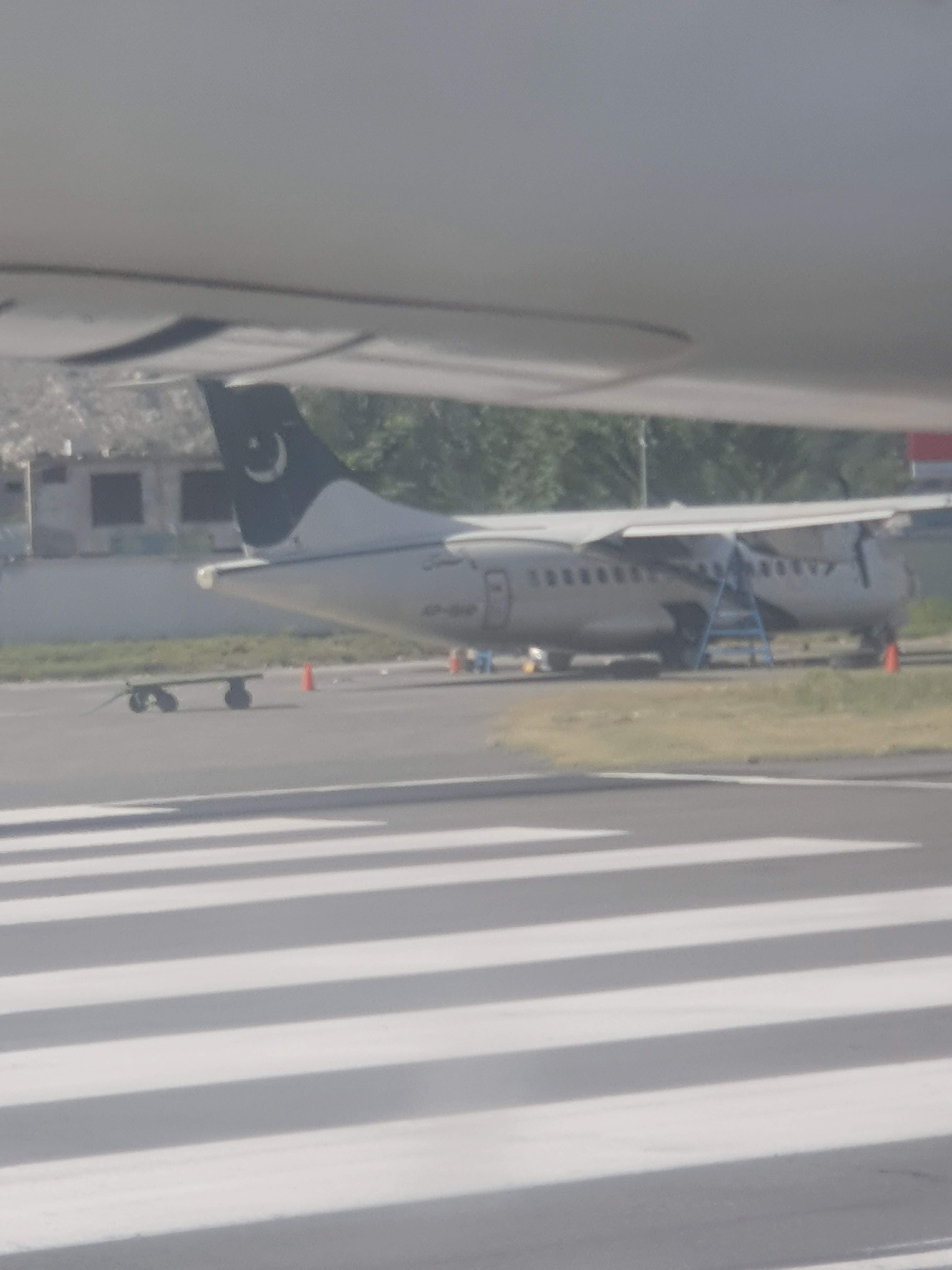
The plane involved in the incident in 2019

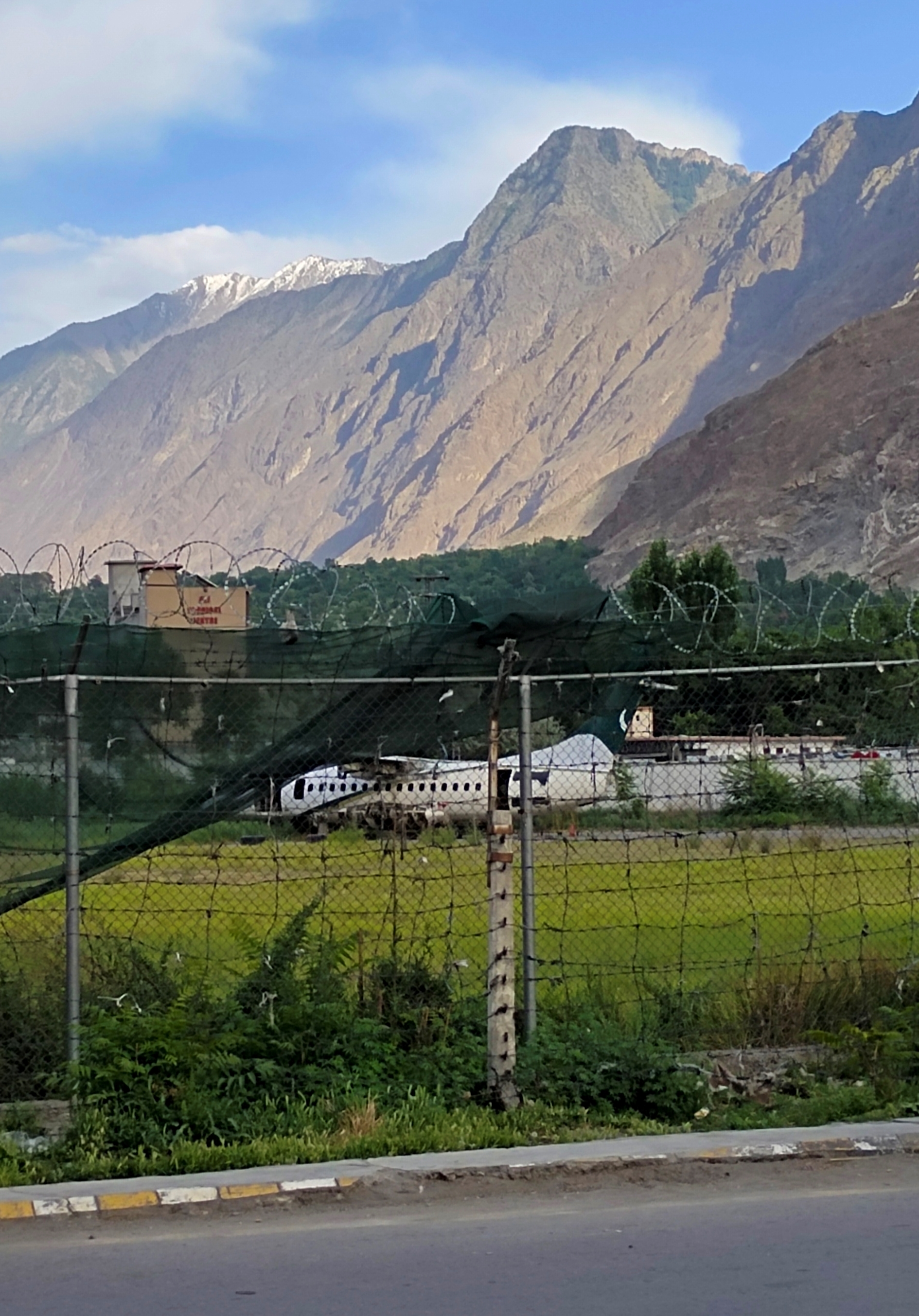
PIA Flight PK 605 Registration AP-BHP involved in the accident at Gilgit Airport. The aircraft has been written off.

- On August 25, 1989, Pakistan International Airlines Flight 404, a Fokker F27 carrying 54 people, disappeared after leaving Gilgit. The wreckage has not been found.
- On July 20, 2019, Pakistan International Airlines Flight 605, an ATR carrying 53 people, skidded off the runway and came to rest on the grass. All the passengers were evacuated safely, but the plane was damaged.

== See also ==
- List of airports in Pakistan
- Airlines of Pakistan
- Skardu International Airport
- Chilas Airfield
- Pakistan Civil Aviation Authority
