= MiniLiner =

Italian cargo airline

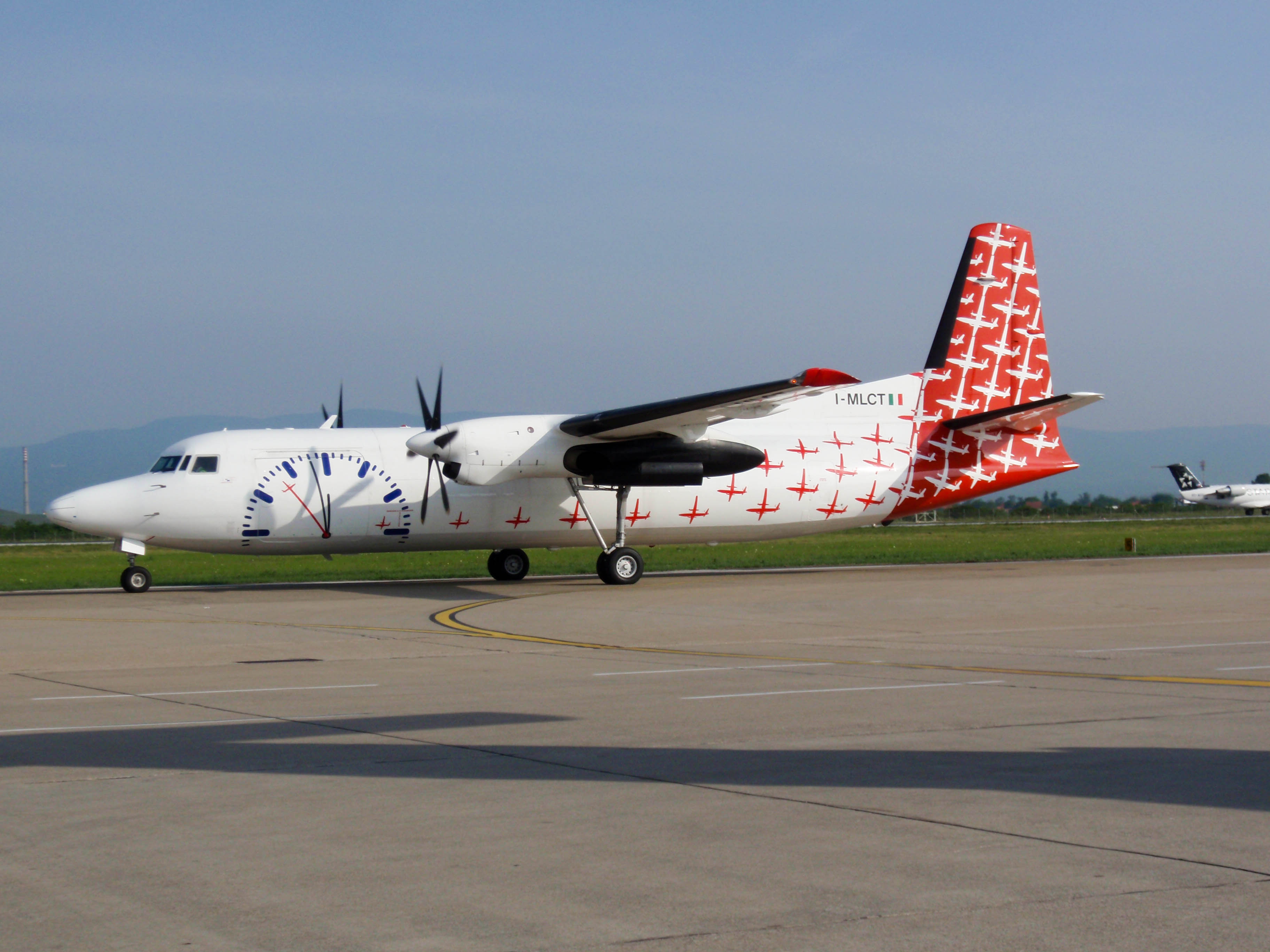
- All-cargo Fokker 50
IATA	ICAO	Call sign
-	MNL	MINILINER
- Founded: 1981
- Ceased operations: 2015
- Hubs: Orio al Serio Airport
- Fleet size: 8
- Headquarters: Bergamo, Italy
- Key people: Giuseppe Berlusconi (CEO)
- Website: miniliner.com

Miniliner s.r.l., trading as MiniLiner, was a cargo airline based in Bergamo, Italy founded in 1981 with the aim of promoting a rapid air transport system for parcels, airmail, and other services using small aircraft and airports. The company began operations in 1982 and it was the first Italian airline to operate overnight cargo flights. It operated scheduled and ad hoc cargo services. Its main base was Orio al Serio Airport. In September 1988, MiniLiner began carrying out air cargo transport services for clients such as FedEx, UPS, DHL, Italian, French, British, and Swedish postal services, as well as several private clients. MiniLiner performed aircraft maintenance for its own account and for third parties at its Orio al Serio base. On 31 January 2015, ENAC (civil aviation authority) revoked the company's air operator's certificate due to its precarious financial situation.

== Fleet ==
The MiniLiner fleet included the following aircraft tipes:

Aircraft	Image	Total	Introduced	Retired	Remark
Fokker F27 Friendship		16	1982	2015	all leased
Fokker 50		4	2009	2015	2 leased
