= Fokker F27 Friendship =

Regional airliner by Fokker

F27 Friendship
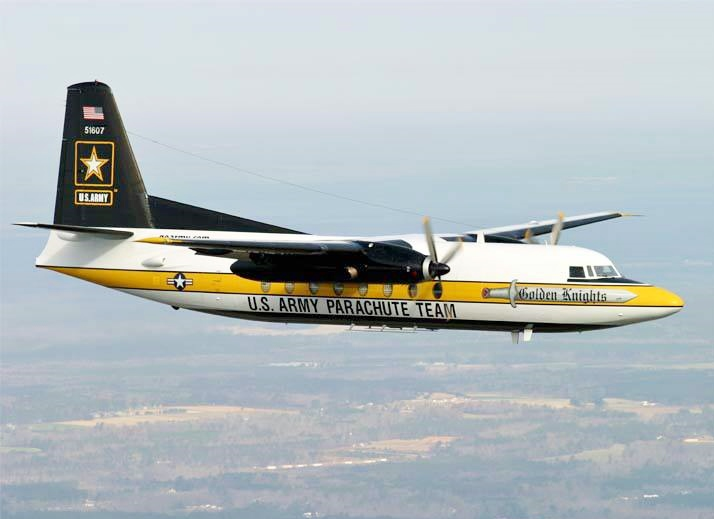
- An F27 Friendship of the US Army Golden Knights

General information
- Type: Regional airliner
- National origin: Netherlands
- Manufacturer: Fokker
- Status: In limited service
- Number built: 586

History
- Manufactured: 1955–1987
- Introduction date: 19 November 1958
- First flight: 24 November 1955
- Variant: Fairchild F-27/FH-227
- Developed into: Fokker 50

The Fokker F27 Friendship is a turboprop airliner developed and manufactured by the Dutch aircraft manufacturer Fokker. It is the most numerous post-war aircraft manufactured in the Netherlands; the F27 was also one of the most successful European airliners of its era. As a result it became the best-selling European turboprop airliner.

The F27 was developed during the early 1950s with the intent of producing a capable successor to the earlier piston engine-powered airliners that had become commonplace on the market, such as the Douglas DC-3. A key innovation of the F27 was the adoption of the Rolls-Royce Dart turboprop engine, which produced substantially less vibration and noise, thus providing improved conditions for passengers. Another major comfort feature was cabin pressurisation. Innovative manufacturing techniques were also employed in the aircraft's construction.

On 24 November 1955, the F27 made its maiden flight; on 19 November 1958, the type was introduced to revenue service. Shortly after its introduction, the F27 was recognised as being a commercial success. Under a licensing arrangement reached between Fokker and the U.S. aircraft manufacturer Fairchild, the F27 was manufactured in the United States by the latter; Fairchild went on to independently develop a stretched version of the airliner, which was designated as the Fairchild FH-227. During the 1980s, Fokker developed a modernised successor to the F27, the Fokker 50, which eventually replaced it in production.

== Design and development ==
=== Origins ===
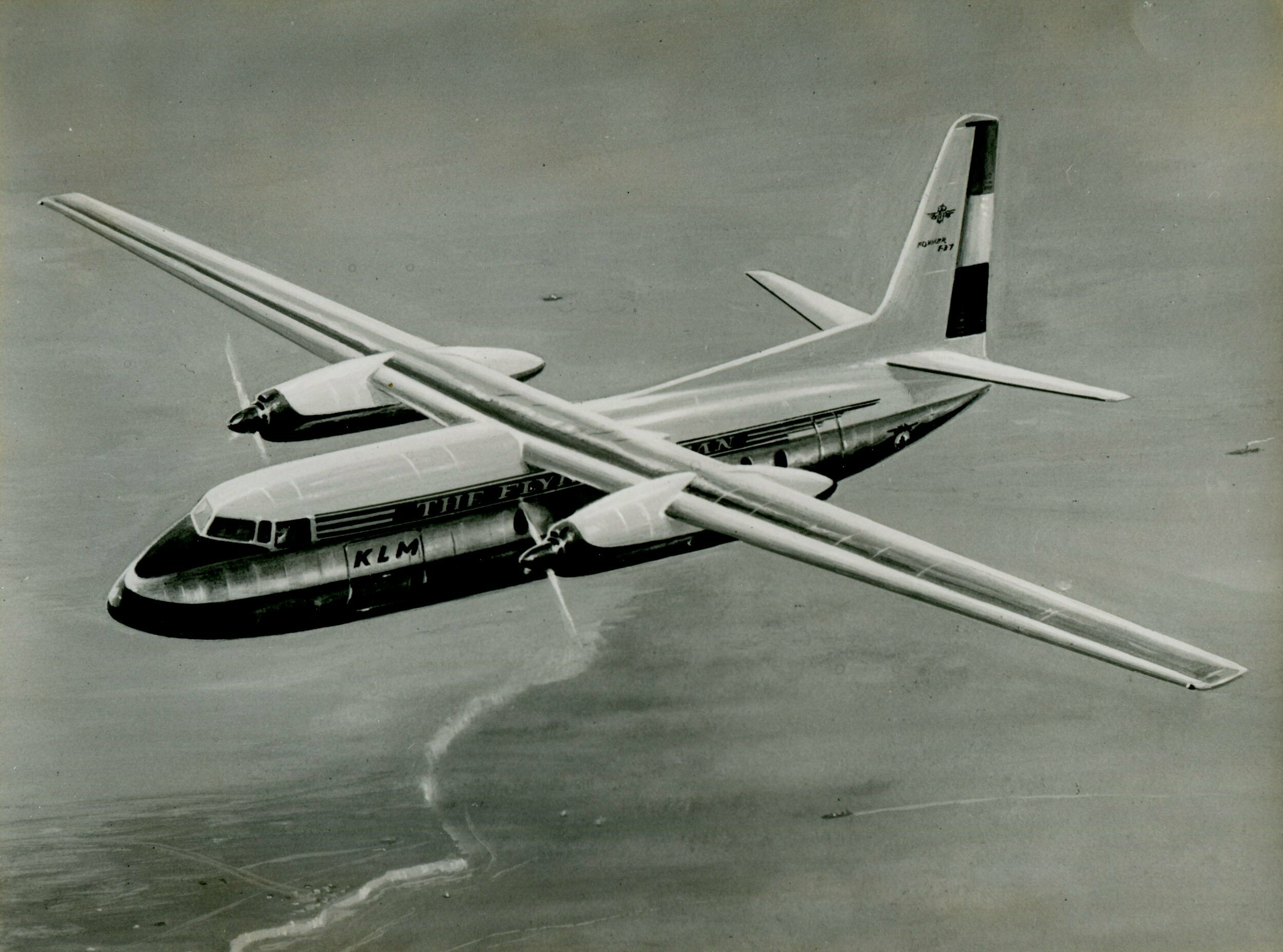
Early concept art of the F27

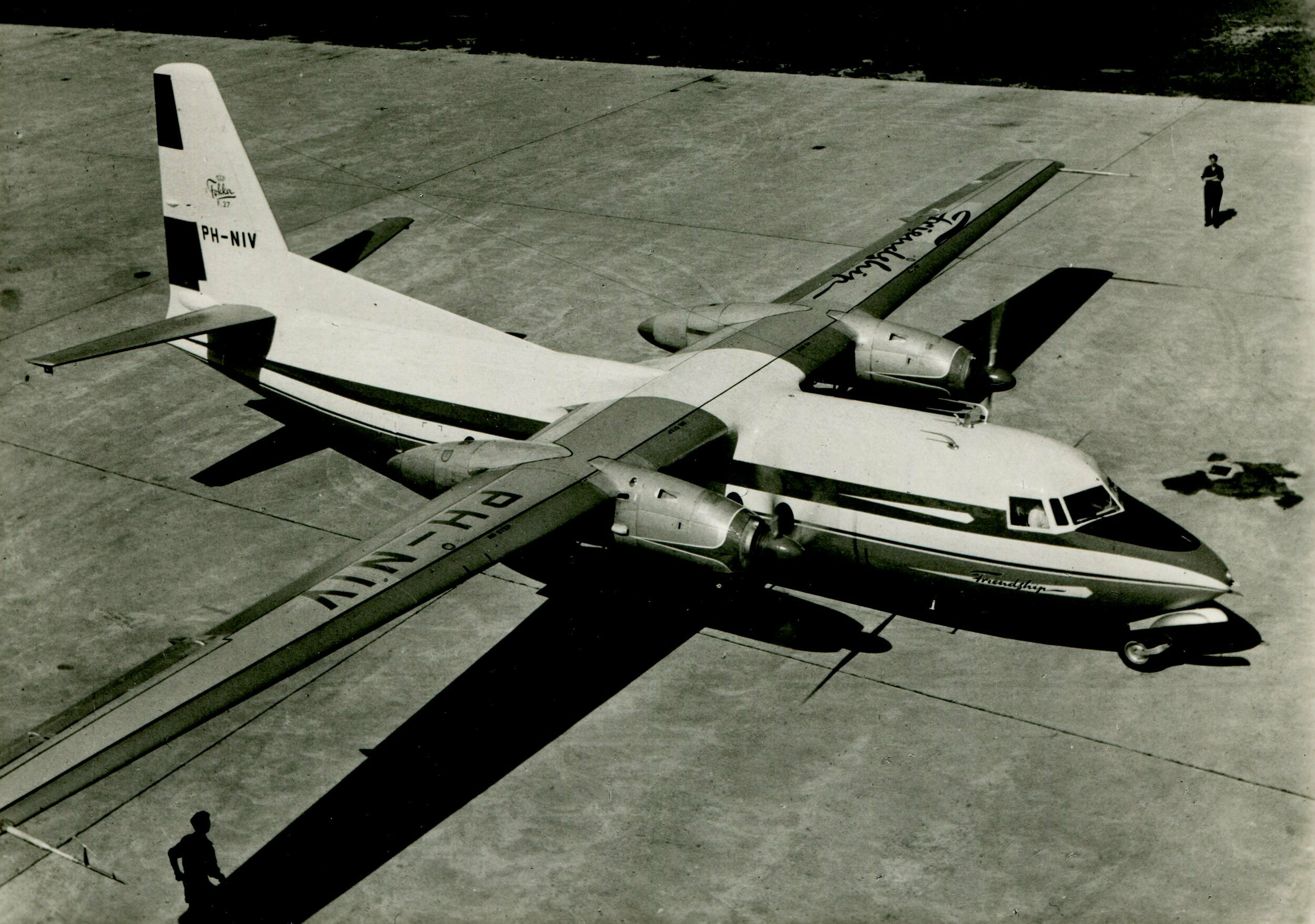
The first F27 prototype, registration PH-NIV

In the aftermath of the Second World War, twin-engine all-metal monoplanes such as the successful Douglas DC-3 airliner dominated commuter aviation. Over 10,000 DC-3s had been manufactured during wartime, which led to the type being highly available and thus encouraging its adoption by hundreds of operators across the world.

By the early 1950s, various aircraft manufacturers had begun considering the post-war requirements of the civil aviation market and several commenced work upon projects aiming to produce designs for new aircraft which would be viewed as best meeting these requirements; Dutch firm Fokker was amongst the companies pursuing development of such an aircraft. By 1951, figures within Fokker were urging that design work be undertaken on a prospective 32-seat airliner intended as a direct replacement for the popular DC-3. Fokker sought the opinions of existing DC-3 operators on what performance increases and refinements they would expect of a new model of commuter aircraft. On the basis of this feedback, the design team chose to incorporate various new technologies into the tentative design.

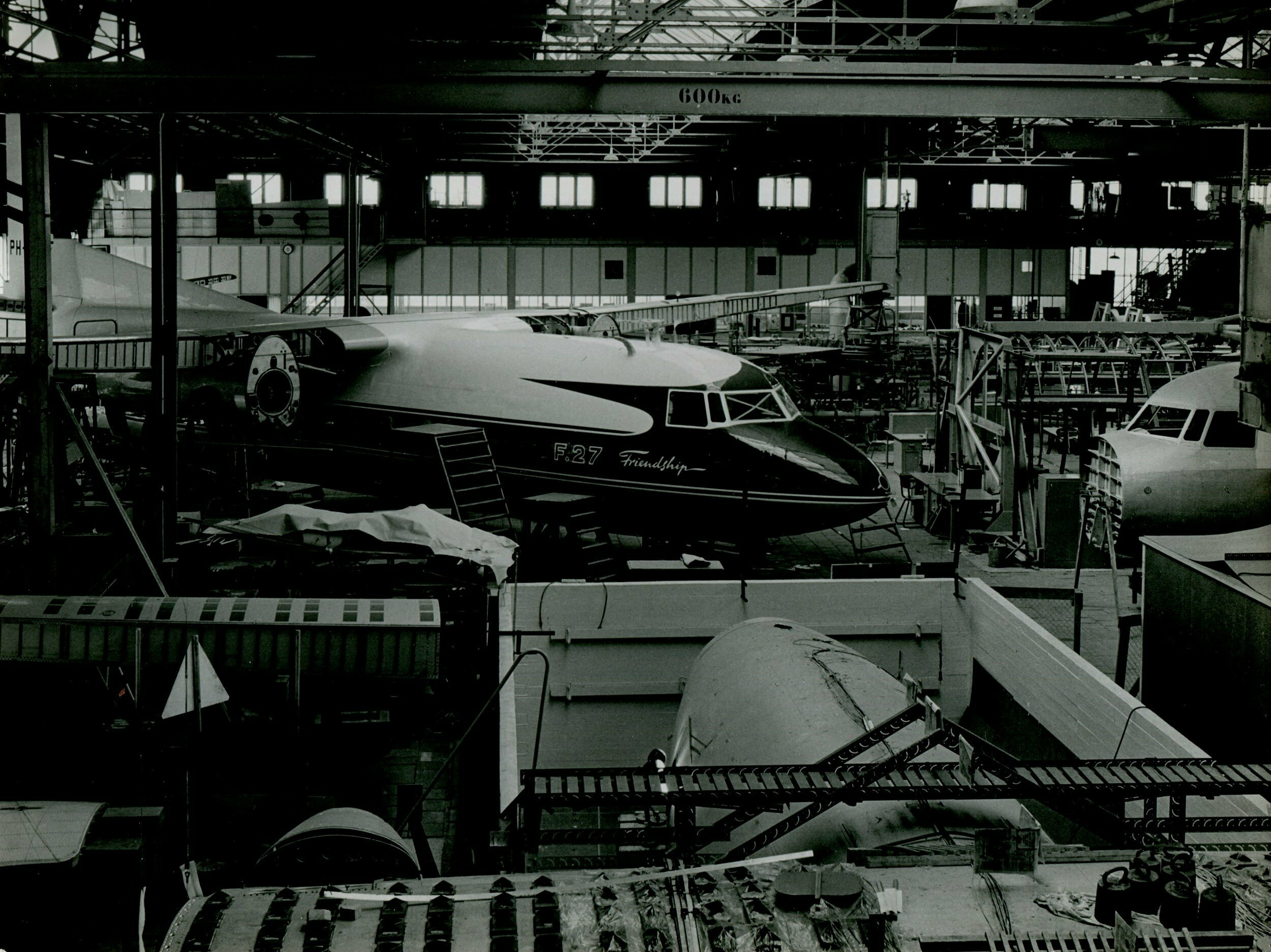
Second F27 prototype under construction in 1956.

Fokker evaluated several potential configurations for the airliner, including the use of Wright Cyclone radial engines, before finally settling upon a high-wing aircraft, which was furnished with a pair of Rolls-Royce Dart turboprop engines and a pressurised cabin which contained a total of 28 passengers. The Dart engine had already proven successful on the early models of the Vickers Viscount, while a high-mounted wing had been selected, as it produced a higher lift coefficient than a lower counterpart. It also enabled easier ground loading due to a lower floor level and provided unfettered external views to passengers without any weight increase. In the aircraft's construction, Fokker used an innovative metal-to-metal bonding technique, Redux, resulting in a longer fatigue life, improved aerodynamics, and a lighter structure; Fokker became the first such company after de Havilland to employ such means.

In 1953, the proposed airliner received the name Friendship. A total of four prototypes were produced, two of these being flyable aircraft that were used for the test flight programme and were paid for by the Netherlands Institute of Aircraft Development; the other two prototypes were for static and fatigue testing. On 24 November 1955, the first prototype, registered PH-NIV, performed its maiden flight. The second prototype and initial production machines were 0.9 m (3 ft) longer than the first prototype in order to address a revealed tendency for slightly tail-heavy handling as well as to provide additional space for four more passengers, raising the maximum number of passengers which could be carried to 32. These aircraft were also powered by the Dart Mk 528 engine, which was capable of generating greater thrust.

=== Further development ===
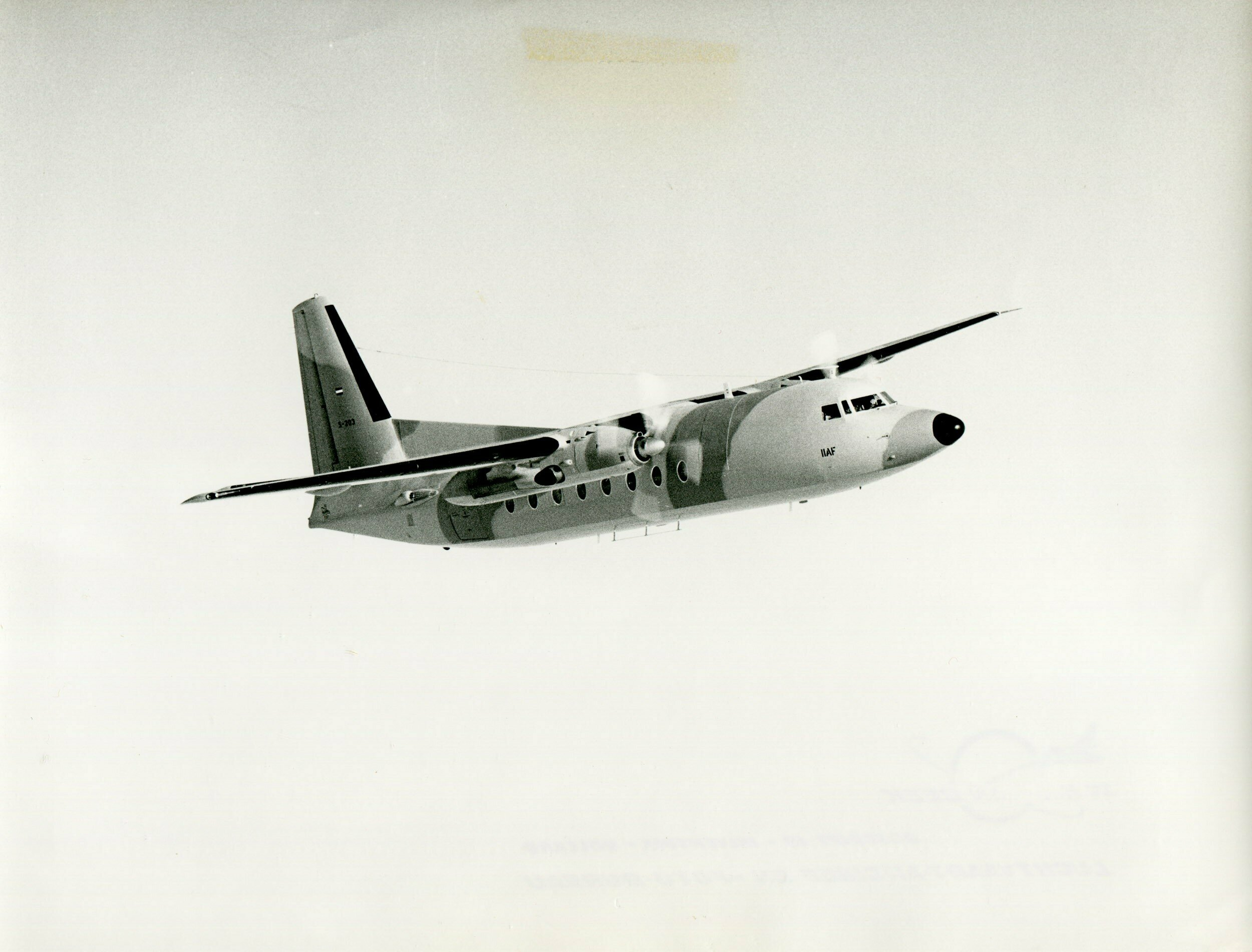
The Imperial Iranian Air Force acquired 19 Fokker F27-400M transport aircraft in 1972.

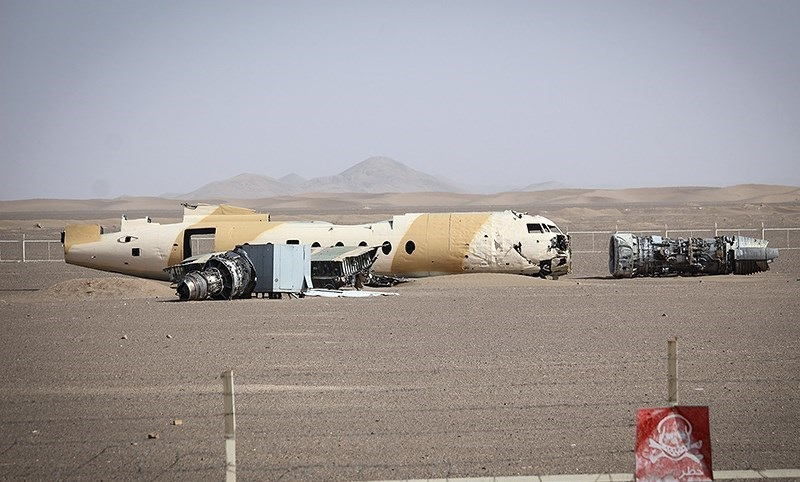
The remains of an Imperial Iranian Air Force Fokker F27-400M transport aircraft at the site of Operation Eagle Claw disaster. (Note: No such aircraft was used in Operation Eagle Claw.)

Throughout the F27's production life, Fokker proceeded to adapt the design for various purposes and roles. Via modifications such as the adoption of improved engines, rearranged loading doors, elongated fuselages, and other changes, several different models of the F27 were developed and made available for commercial operators. Several military transport models were also produced. Fokker also chose to design a dedicated model of the F27 for conducting maritime reconnaissance missions.

During 1952, Fokker established a relationship with the US aircraft manufacturer Fairchild, which was interested in the upcoming F27. In 1956, Fokker signed a licensing deal with Fairchild, under which the latter was authorised to manufacture the F27 in the USA. On 12 April 1958, the first American-built aircraft conducted its first flight. Production of Fairchild built aircraft would continue until July 1973. Fairchild proceeded to independently develop a stretched version of the airliner, designated as the FH-227. The majority of sales completed by Fairchild fell within the North American market.

In the early 1980s, Fokker decided to develop a modernised successor to the F27 Friendship, designated as the F27 Mark 050 and marketed as the Fokker 50. Although originating from the F27-500 airframe, the Fokker 50 was virtually a new aircraft, complete with Pratt & Whitney Canada engines and modern systems, which led to its general performance and passenger comfort being noticeably improved over the F27. The Fokker 50 ultimately replaced the F27 in production.

== Operational history ==
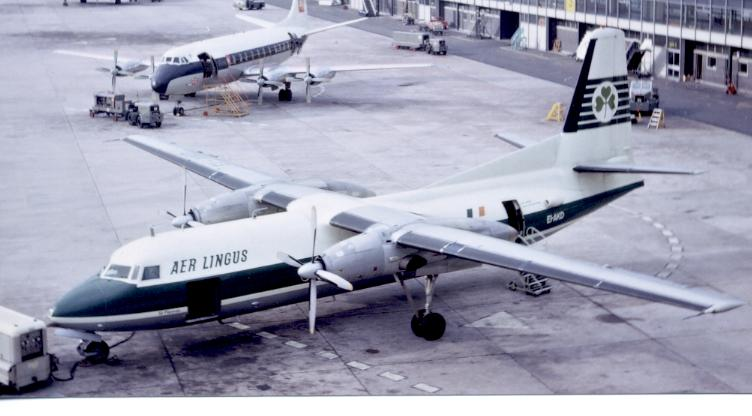
Aer Lingus was the first airline to operate the F27 Friendship

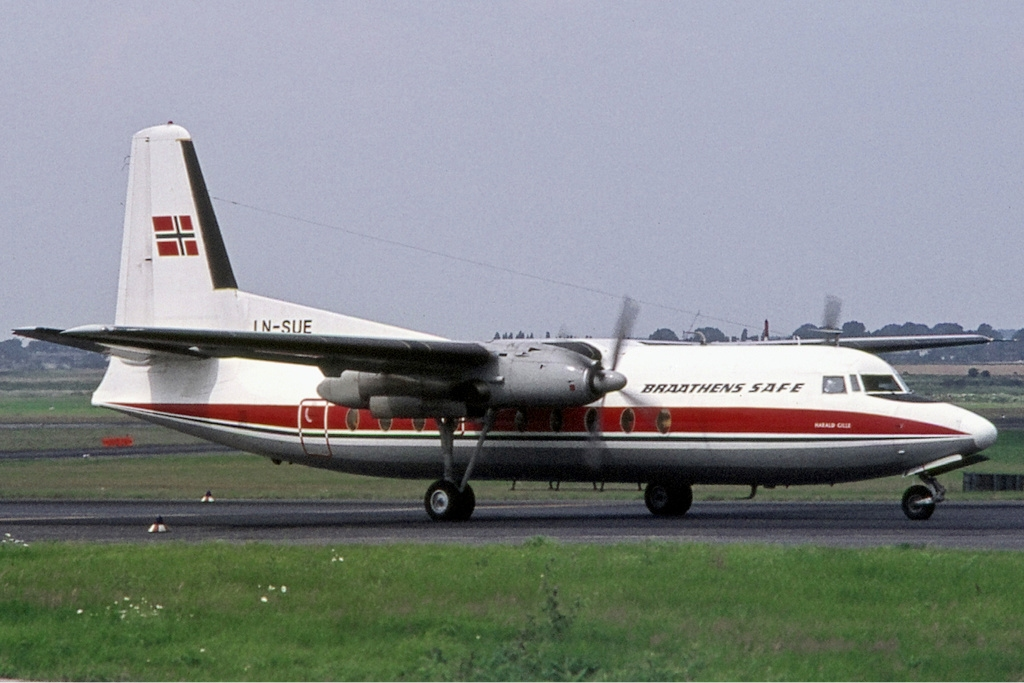
Braathens SAFE F27-100 Friendship in August 1974

In November 1958, the first production aircraft, an F27-100 model, was delivered to Irish airline Aer Lingus; it performed its first revenue flight in the following month. Other early customers of the Friendship included Braathens SAFE and Luxair in Europe; New Zealand National Airways Corporation; Trans Australia Airlines and its Australian competitors Ansett and East-West Airlines; and Turkish Airlines.

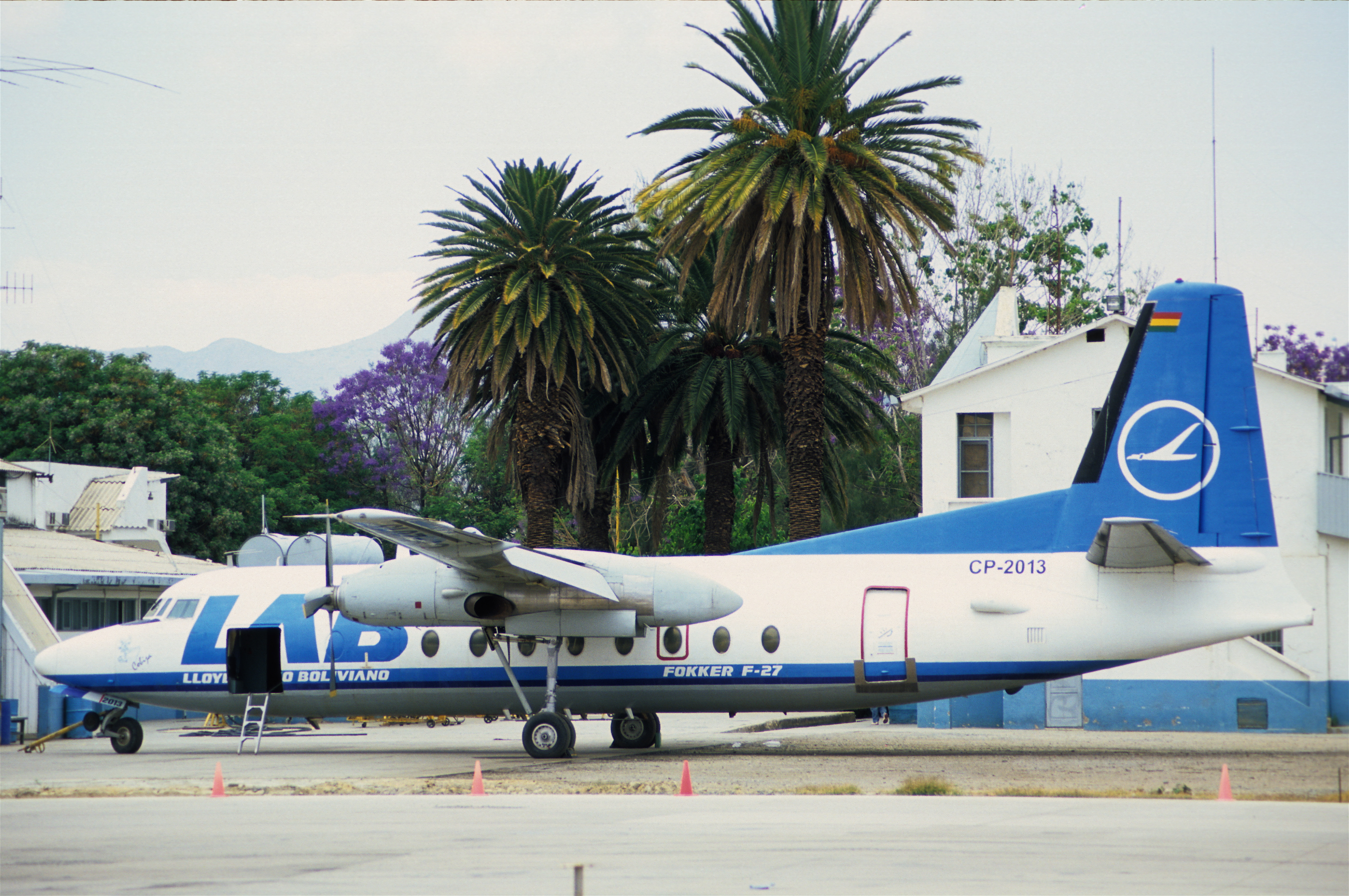
A Lloyd Aéreo Boliviano F-27 with its cargo door open. Passengers board via the rear-fuselage door while freight is stored in the front

Initial sales for the type were slow, which led to Fokker seeking financial support from banks and from the Dutch government in order to maintain production of the airliner while more customers were sought. In 1960, demand for the F27 increased rapidly as multiple airlines placed sizable orders for the type. This is in part due to the spreading reputation of the type, having been found by operators that, in comparison to its piston-engine wartime counterparts like the DC-3, the F27 possessed superior levels of efficiency, enabling faster flight times, greater passenger comfort and a higher level of reliability.

In 1960, the base purchase price for an RDa.6-powered F27 was £239,000. By the end of the production run for the Fokker F27 in 1987, a total of 592 units had been completed by Fokker (additionally, another 207 F-27s and FH-227s had been produced in the US by Fairchild), more than any other western European civil turboprop airliner at the time.

In later service, many aircraft have been modified from their original configurations for passenger service to perform cargo or express-package freighter duties instead. The last major cargo user of the F27 in the United States was FedEx Express, using it as a cargo "feeder" aircraft. These were retired and replaced by a mixture of ATR 42 and ATR 72 aircraft by the end of 2009, the last of these aircraft were subsequently donated to the Hickory Aviation Museum.

As of July 2010 a total of 65 F27s were in commercial service with almost 30 different airlines. By July 2013, only 25 Friendships remained in service, operated by 13 different airlines; most of these were F27-500s, with two -400s and a solitary -600 series aircraft in service. Italian cargo airline MiniLiner operated six F27s and Air Panama had four in its fleet. The United States Army Parachute Team has operated a single C-31A Troopship for conducting its skydiving exhibitions since 1985. As of July 2018, 10 aircraft remain in service operated by 7 airlines.

== Variants ==
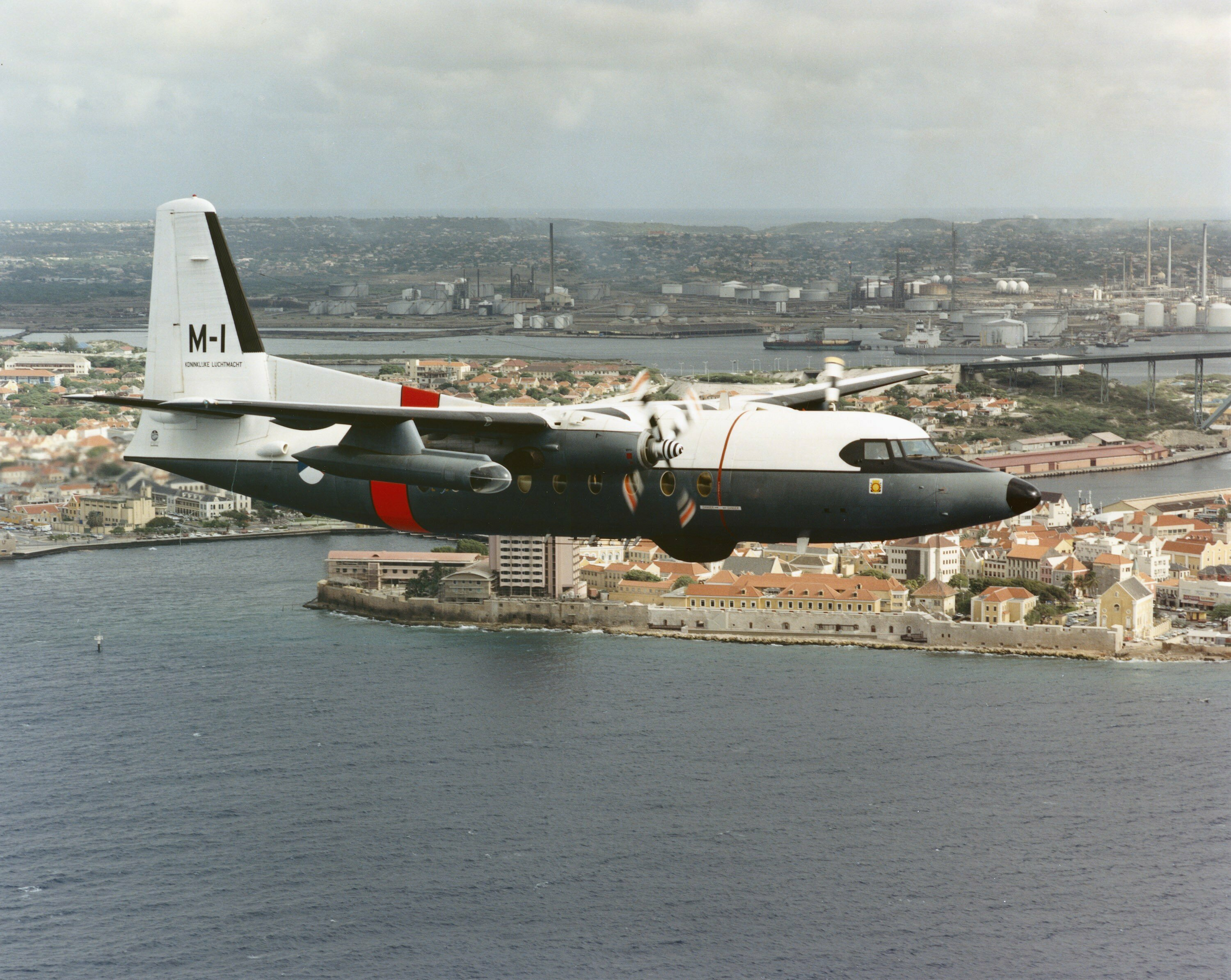
F27 200-MAR maritime reconnaissance aircraft of the Royal Netherlands Air Force

External videos
- Footage of a Fokker F27 taxiing on the ground and taking off
- A Promotional Film produced in 1957 focusing on the F.27 Friendship airliner
- A Dutch Air Force Fokker performing a flight display in Gardermoen, Norway, 1984

- F27-100 - This was the first production model; 44 passengers.
- F27-200 - It was powered by the more powerful Dart Mk 532 engine.
- F27-300 Combiplane - A combined civil passenger/cargo aircraft.
- F27-300M Troopship - Military transport version for Royal Netherlands Air Force.
- F27-400 - "Combi" passenger/cargo aircraft, with two Rolls-Royce Dart 7 turboprop engines and large cargo door.
- F27-400M - Military version for US Army with designation C-31A Troopship, still in use in 2018. Last retired September 2019. 85-01608 "Excalibur" transferred to Vliegend Nederlands Cultureel Erfgoed (Flying Dutch Cultural Heritage) based at Lelystad Airport (EHLE) One C-31A auctioned in October 2019.
- F27-500 - equipped with a 1.5 m (4 ft 11 in) longer fuselage, a return to the Dart Mk 528 engine, and accommodation for up to 52 passengers. It first flew in November 1967.
- F27-500M - Military version of the -500.
- F27-500F - A version of the -500 for Australia with smaller front and rear doors.
- F27-600 - Quick change cargo/passenger version of -200 with large cargo door.
- F27-700 - A F27-100 with a large cargo door.
- F27 200-MAR - Unarmed maritime reconnaissance version.
- F27 Maritime Enforcer - Armed maritime reconnaissance version.
- F-27 - License-built version manufactured by Fairchild Hiller in the United States
- FH-227 - Stretched version of the F-27, independently developed and manufactured by Fairchild Hiller in the United States
- B.TPh.1 - (Thai: บ.ตผ.๑) Royal Thai Armed Forces designation for the F27-200.
- B.LL.1 - (Thai: บ.ลล.๑) Royal Thai Armed Forces designation for the F27-400.

== Operators ==
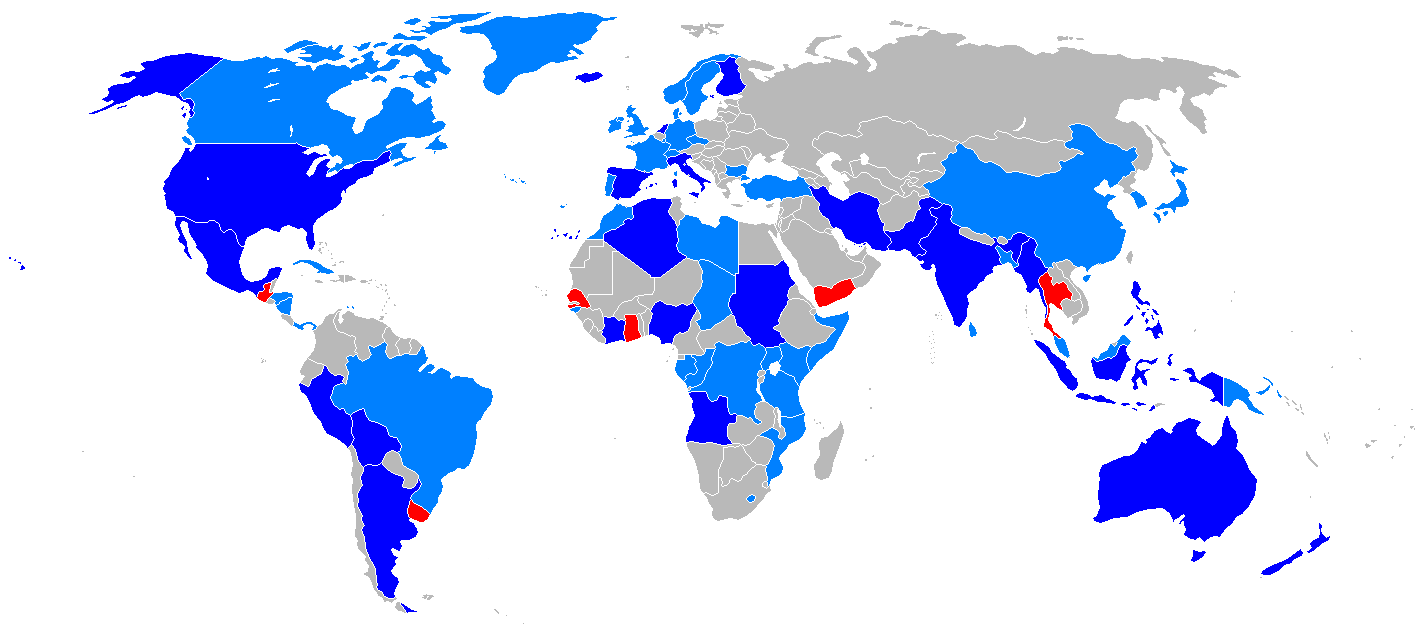
Map of F27 operators. Light blue indicates civilian use only. Dark blue indicates both civilian and military use. Red indicates military use only.

== Accidents and incidents ==
- On 10 June 1960, Trans Australia Airlines Flight 538 crashed in the sea near Mackay, Queensland, Australia, with 29 fatalities, in what is still the deadliest civilian Australian aircraft accident in history. The investigation was unable to determine the probable cause of this accident, but it was critical in the development of the flight recorder to record parameters that aid investigations of future airliner accidents.
- On 23 September 1961, Turkish Airlines Flight 835, an F-27-100, struck the Karanlıktepe hill during approach, killing 28 of the 29 on board.
- On February 28, 1967, Philippine Airlines Flight 345, an F-27 100, crashed on approach to Mactan–Cebu International Airport. The aircraft pitched upwards, then banked and descended, with its left wing striking trees and then the ground, ending with the fuselage nosing over and sliding onto its back, catching fire. 12 of the 19 occupants were killed. A contributing factor to the crash was improper load distribution, which affected the aircraft's centre of gravity.
- On 6 July 1967, Philippines Airlines Flight 385, an F-27-100, crashed 10 minutes after takeoff on the slopes of Mount Kanlaon, killing all 21 on board.
- On 21 April 1969, an Indian Airlines flight crashed in a thunderstorm while crossing East Pakistan (now Bangladesh) airspace on its flight from Agartala to Calcutta, killing all 44 people on board.
- On 6 August 1970, a Pakistan International Airlines Fokker F27 turboprop aircraft crashed near the small village Rawat, after take-off from Islamabad in a thunderstorm, killing all 30 people on board.
- On 26 September 1970, a Flugfélag Íslands Fokker F27 Friendship, with registration TF-FIL, crashed into the mountains of Mykines in the Faroe Islands, in heavy fog, killing the Icelandic captain and seven Faroese passengers. 26 passenger and crew survived the crash. Three passengers, who escaped with minor injuries, hiked for an hour down the mountain to the village of Mykines, alerting authorities. The majority of the villagers went up the mountain to aid the injured.
- On 23 January 1971, a domestic scheduled Korean Air Lines passenger flight, operated by a Fokker F27 Friendship 500, between Gangneung and Seoul was hijacked by a man armed with hand grenades in the sky over Hongcheon County, Gangwon Province. A security officer shot the hijacker, and as he fell, the bomb he was holding exploded, and a co-pilot blocked it with his body, cutting off his left leg and right arm, and he later died from excessive bleeding. The aircraft crash-landed on a deserted beach in Goseong County, Gangwon, near Sokcho, South Korea. The aircraft was written off.
- On 30 January 1971, Indian Airlines Fokker Friendship aircraft Ganga was hijacked by Hashim Quereshi and his cousin Ashraf Butt, and was flown to Lahore, Pakistan, where the passengers and crew were released and the aircraft was burnt on February 1, 1971.
- On 12 December 1971, a Fokker F27 Friendship registered AP-ALX, operating an international flight between Karachi and Zahedan, crashed in Pakistan near the Iranian border, killing all 4 people on board.
- On 30 October 1972, Aero Trasporti Italiani Flight 327 descended into a farmhouse near Corato, killing all 27 on board.
- On 8 December 1972, Pakistan International Airlines Flight 631, an F-27-600, crashed on a mountain terrain, killing all 26 or 32 on board.
- On 25 March 1978, Fokker F-27 Friendship 200 XY-ADK lost altitude and crashed into a paddy field just after take-off from Mingaladon Airport, killing all 48 people on board.
- On 14 September 1978, a Philippine Air Force F27 crashed due to wind shear; 15 of the 24 people on board were killed, as well as 17 people on the ground.
- On 17 February 1979, Air New Zealand Flight 4374, a F27-500 crashed while landing at Auckland International Airport in poor weather, killing two of the four people on board.
- On 26 May 1980, a Nigerian Air Force F27 crashed due to a thunderstorm, killing all 30 people on board. The aircraft was carrying a delegation of military and government officials on a diplomatic mission.
- On 20 July 1981, Somali Airlines Flight 40 crashed near Balad, Somalia. All 50 passengers and crew on board were killed.
- On 5 August 1984, a Biman Bangladesh Airlines Fokker F27-600 crashed into a marsh near Zia International Airport (now Shahjalal International Airport) in Dhaka, Bangladesh, while landing in poor weather. With a total death toll of 49 people, it is the deadliest aviation disaster to occur on Bangladeshi soil.
- On 20 February 1986, an Iranian F27-600 commanded by Colonel Abdolbaghi Darvish was shot down by an Iraqi fighter jet. All 49 crew and passengers were killed. The aircraft was carrying a delegation of military and government officials on a mission.
- On 29 April 1986, a Peruvian Navy F-27 400M (reg. AE-561) crashed in the Grau Sea off the coast of Huacho, killing its seven occupants.
- On 16 August 1986, a Sudan Airways F27 was shot down by the Sudan People's Liberation Army, killing all 60 people on board. The Shootdown remains the worst involving the F27 and in South Sudan.
- On 23 October 1986, a Pakistan International Airlines F27 crashed while coming in to land in the northwestern city of Peshawar, killing 13 of the 54 people on board.
- On 21 June 1987, a Burma Airways Fokker F-27 Friendship 200 slammed into an 8200-ft-high mountain 15 minutes after take-off from Heho Airport, killing all 45 people on board.
- On 8 December 1987, in the Alianza Lima air disaster, an F27 of the Peruvian Navy that was transporting the Alianza Lima football team crashed in Lima, Peru, killing the whole team.
- 11 October 1987, a Burma Airways F-27-500 crashed into a 1500-ft-high mountain, killing all 49 people on board. This was Myanmar's second-deadliest air disaster, surpassed only by the crash of a Myanmar Air Force Shaanxi Y-8 in 2017, which killed 122 people. Thirty-six foreigners—14 Americans, seven Swiss citizens, five Britons, four Australians, three West Germans, two French citizens, and one Thai—were among the dead.
- On 19 October 1988 thirty-four died in a Vayudoot F27 crash near Guwahati, India.
- On 25 August 1989, a Pakistan International Airlines F27 operating as Pakistan International Airlines Flight 404 and carrying 54 people disappeared after leaving Gilgit in northern Pakistan. The wreckage was never found.
- On 12 February 1990, TAM Airlines Flight 540 failed to go around and crashed into a residential area, killing two on ground and the instructor of the 40 on board.
- On 10 September 1992, Expreso Aéreo Flight 015, an F27-500 (reg. OB-1443), crashed in the airstrip of the remote Amazon town of Bellavista in Peru. Due to a pilot error on approximation, possibly compounded by fatigue and the co-pilot's lack of experience, the plane hit the ground shortly before the runway threshold (practically crash-landing) and broke up in several parts, killing the pilot in the ensuing fire. The six remaining crew members and the 36 passengers managed to evacuate and survived, although some were injured.
- On 1 July 1995, an East West Airlines Fokker F27, registered VT-EWE, was engaged in a touch-and-go landing training exercise at Vadodara Airport when the aircraft's left main landing gear failed on touchdown. The aircraft continued moving forward on its belly and skid to a halt on the runway. There was no fire and no injury to persons on board the aircraft. Poor maintenance was cited as a contributory factor in the accident. The aircraft was written off.
- On 8 November 1995, an Argentine Air Force F27, tail number TC-72, operating a LADE civilian flight from Comodoro Rivadavia to Córdoba, crashed (32.112270°S 64.948023°W) near the summit of Cerro Champaquí in Córdoba, killing all 52 passengers and crew.
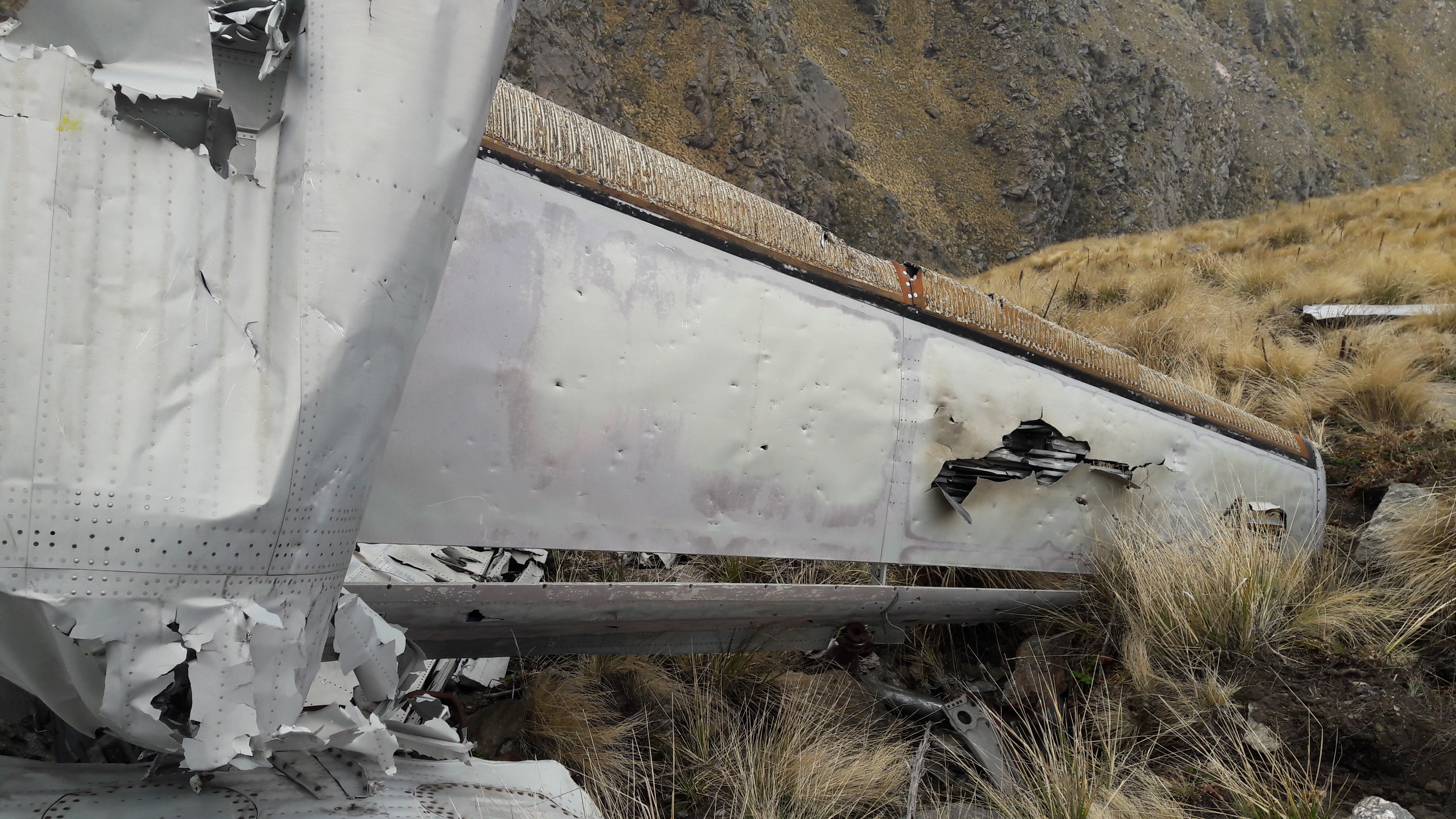
  Crashed Fokker F27 TC-72 near Cerro Champaquí, Argentina
- On 17 July 1997, Sempati Air Flight 304 crashed at Bandung, West Java, shortly after take-off, when after an engine failure, the crew mishandled the return to the airport on one engine.
- On 27 January 1998, a Myanma Airways Fokker F27 crashed while taking off from Yangon, Myanmar, killing 16 of the 45 people on board.
- On 24 August 1998, Myanma Airways Flight 635 crashed into a hill on approach to Tachilek Airport, killing all 36 on board.
- On 12 January 1999, a Channel Express F-27-600F (registration: G-CHNL) cargo flight from Luton Airport to Guernsey Airport was incorrectly loaded affecting centre of gravity, stalled on approach to the airport, crashed, and caught fire. The fire spread to two nearby homes, killing the pilots and injuring one person on the ground.
- On 11 November 2002, Laoag International Airlines Flight 585 crashed into Manila Bay in the Philippines; 19 of the 34 people on board were killed.
- On 20 February 2003, a military F27 crashed in northwestern Pakistan, killing Pakistan Air Force Air Chief Marshal Mushaf Ali Mir, his wife, and 15 others.
- Pakistan International Airlines Flight 688, carrying 45 people, crashed 2–3 minutes after take-off from Multan airport on 10 July 2006, with no survivors. Engine fire was suspected as the cause of the crash.
- On 6 April 2009, an Indonesian Air Force F27 crashed in Bandung, Indonesia, killing all 24 occupants on board. The cause of the accident was said to be heavy rain. The aircraft reportedly crashed into a hangar during its landing procedure and killed all on board.
- On 21 June 2012, an Indonesian Air Force F27 crashed into a housing complex in the capital Jakarta, setting six houses on fire and killing at least 11 people.
- On 24 June 2022, a Cargo2Fly F27 5Y-CCE landed heavily on the runway at Juba International Airport, South Sudan, with the undercarriage retracted after the aircraft failed to climb on takeoff. No injuries.

== Aircraft on display ==
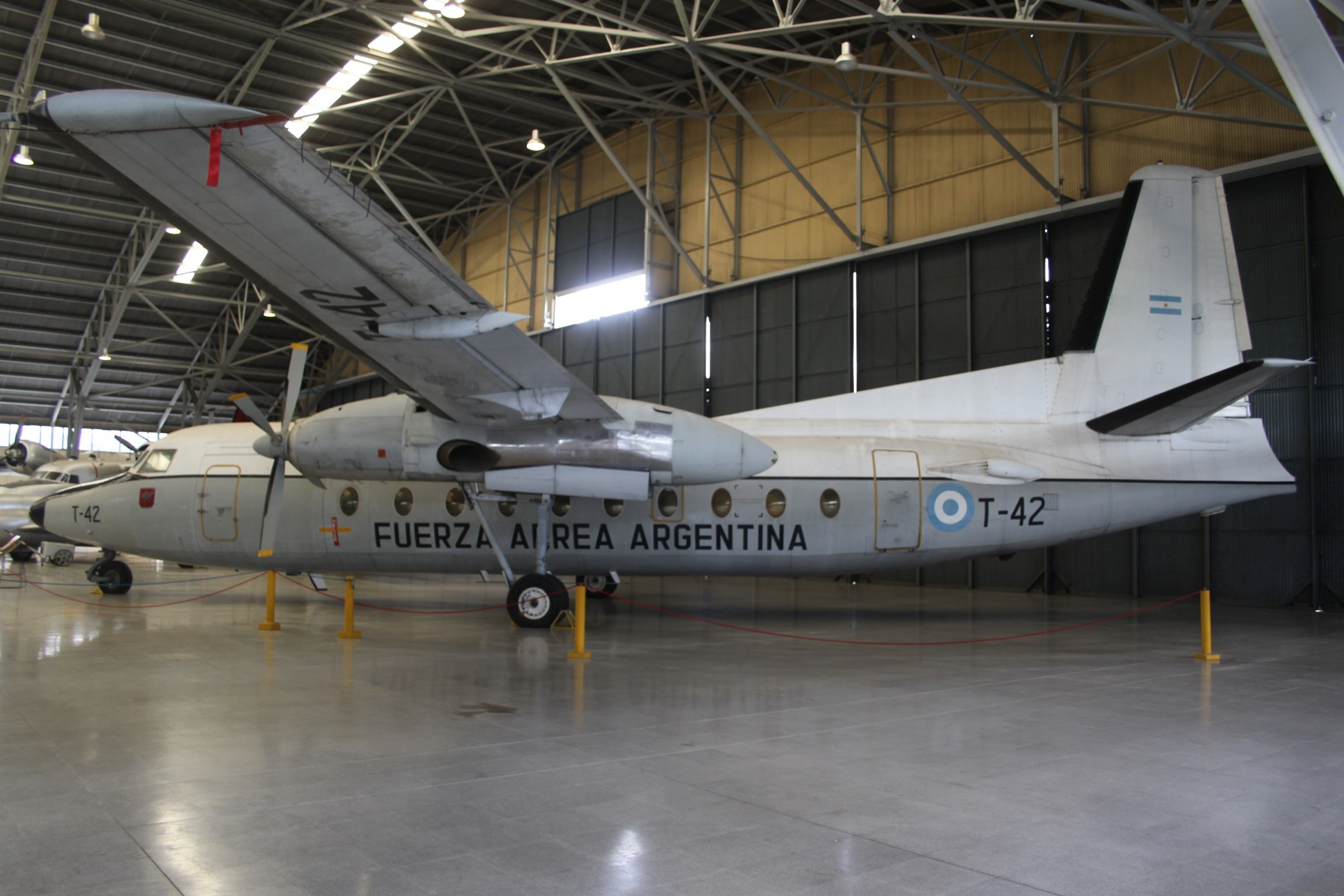
Argentine Air Force F27 T-42

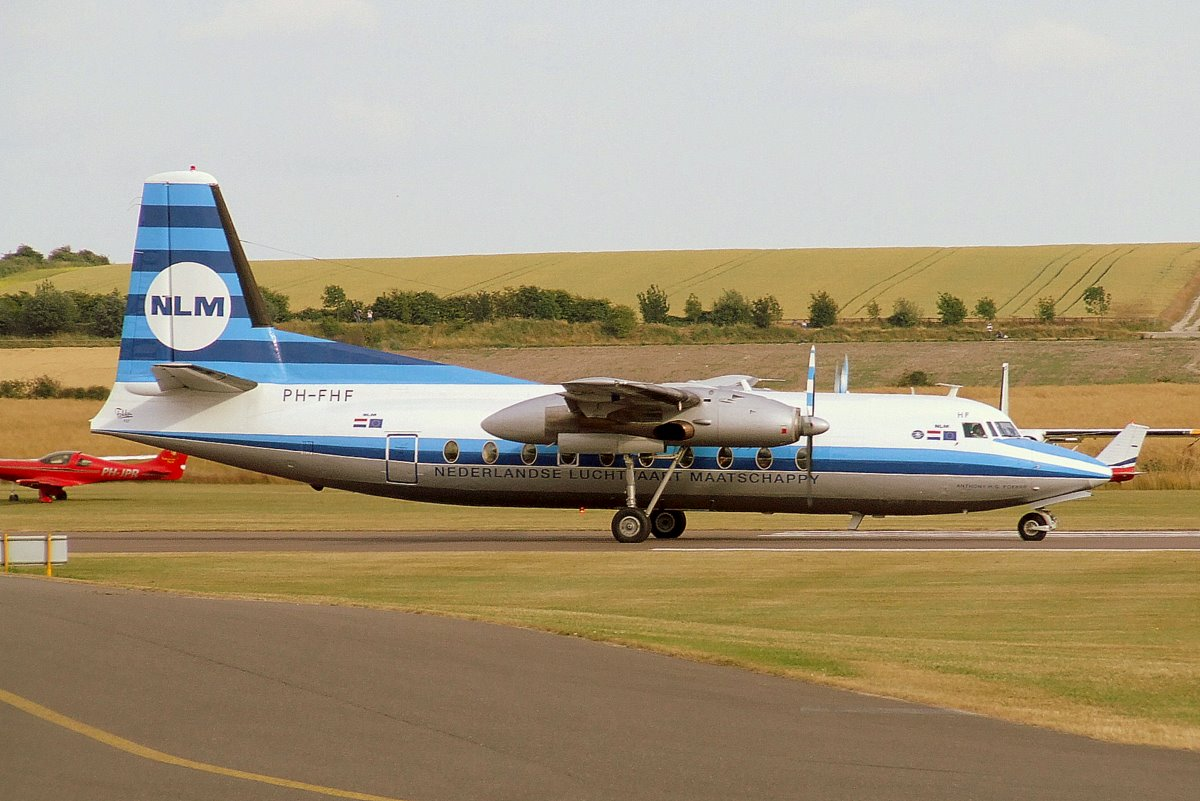
The first production Fokker F27 in NLM colours at an airshow in 2006

Argentina

- T-42 ex-Argentine Air Force on static display at the Museo Nacional de Aeronáutica de Argentina.
- T-44 ex-Argentine Air Force on static display at the Second Aerial Brigade in Paraná, Entre Ríos.

Australia

- 10132 — F27-109 is on static display at the South Australian Aviation Museum in Adelaide. It was previously operated as VH-CAT by the CSIRO as an atmospheric research aircraft.
- 10315 — F27-600QC is on static display at the Queensland Air Museum at Caloundra Airport. It was originally manufactured as an F27-400 and later redesignated as a -600QC. The aircraft was delivered new to Australia and spent most of its career operating for Ansett.
- 10596 — F27-500 was delivered airworthy to the Historical Aircraft Restoration Society, Shellharbour Airport on 26 February 2018. It had been operated by Airwork under contract to New Zealand Post.

Finland

- Finnish Air Force's first F27, designated "FF-1" and nicknamed "Ansa", is on static display at the Satakunta Air Wing garrison in Pirkkala, Finland. It was operated as FF-1 in the Finnish Air Force as both transport and signal reconnaissance plane; FF-2 and FF-3 were equipped for parachutists, typically used in platoon size smaller drops for which the type was well suited. Before military use, FF-1 was operated briefly by Karair (later merged into Finnair) as OH-KFA. The aircraft was initially operated by Icelandair.

Iceland

- 10545 — F27-200-MAR is on static display at the Akureyri Aviation Museum at Akureyri Airport. It was previously operated as TF-SYN by the Icelandic Coast Guard.

Indonesia

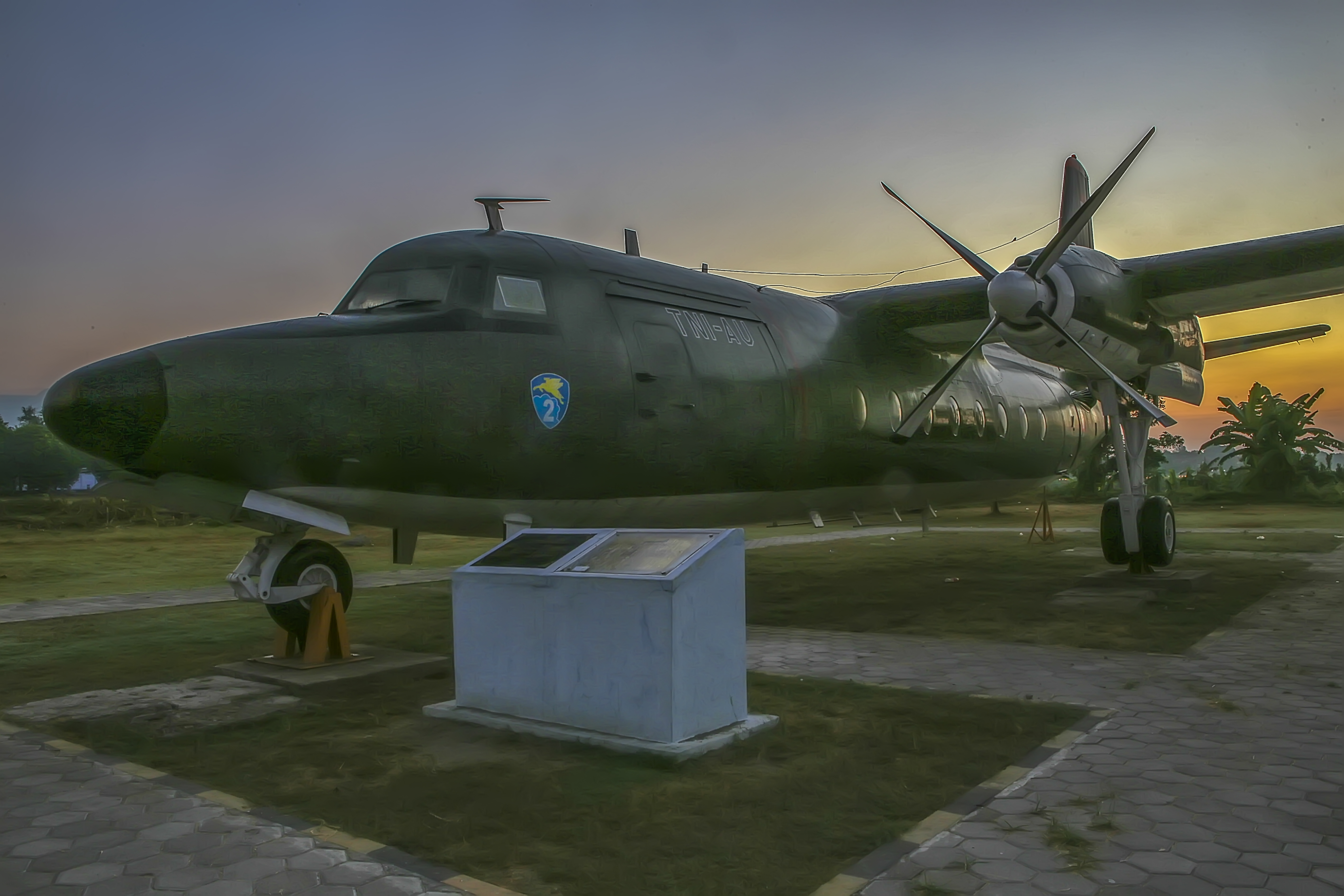
F27-400M of the Indonesian Air Force at Dirgantara Mandala Museum in Yogyakarta

- 10541 — F27-400M is on static display at the Halim Perdanakusuma Air Force Base in Jakarta. It was previously operated as A-2705 by the Indonesian Air Force.
- 10544 — F27-400M is on static display at the Dirgantara Mandala Museum in Yogyakarta. It was previously operated as A-2707 by the Indonesian Air Force.

Netherlands

- 10102 — F27-100 is on static display at the Aviodrome in Lelystad. It was previously registered as PH-NVF, and is one of the prototype F27s, in whose colours it is painted.
- 10105 — F27-100 is also on static display at the Aviodrome. It was previously registered as PH-FHF, is the first production F27, and is painted in the colours of NLM CityHopper.
- 10183 — F27-100 on static display at a bed-and-breakfast in Hoogerheide. The 75th production Fokker 27 rolled out of the factory on July 13, 1961. Ordered by Turkish Airlines. Registered as TC-TEK. Bought back by Fokker in 1974 and used as a test bed for a prototype maritime version of which eventually 14 editions were made. Her new registration was PH-FCX. Last flight was made on June 30, 1983.
- 10449 — F27-500 is on static display at Fokker Logistics Park in Oude Meer. It was previously registered as N19XE and is painted as PH-NIV, the first prototype F27. It marks the former location of the Fokker factory at Amsterdam Airport Schiphol.
- C-10 — F27-300M is on static display at the Militaire Luchtvaart Museum in Soesterberg, Utrecht.

New Zealand

- 10189 — F27-100 is on static display at the Ferrymead Aeronautical Society in Ferrymead Heritage Park in Christchurch. It was previously operated as ZK-BXG and is painted in National Airways Corporation colours.
- 10190 — F27-100 is on static display at the National Transport & Toy Museum in Wānaka. It was previously registered as ZK-BXH.
- 10286 — F27-100 is under restoration at the Chatham Islands Aviation Museum in Waitangi, Chatham Islands. It was previously registered as ZK-BXI.

Norway

- 10298 — F27-100 is on static display at the Flyhistorisk Museum, Sola near Stavanger; it was operated by Braathens S.A.F.E and Busy Bee as LN-SUF.

Pakistan

- A Pakistan International Airlines Fokker F27-200 is on display just outside Chitral Airport at Fokker F27 Friendship Restaurant. The aircraft AP-AUR was operating Flight PK660 and was landing at Chitral in 2004 when its brakes failed causing the aircraft to overrun.

Philippines

- 59-0259 — F27-200 Philippine Air Force which once served as the presidential plane of the late President Ferdinand E. Marcos, is now on static display at the People's Park in Barangay E. Lopez, Silay City, Negros Occidental.

United Kingdom

- 10196 — F27-200 is on static display at the City of Norwich Aviation Museum in Horsham, St Faith. It was previously operated as G-BHMY by AirUK.
- 10201 — F27-500 is on static display at the City of Norwich Aviation Museum. Delivered to All Nippon Airways in 1963 then operated by Limburg Airlines, Air Anglia and AirUK before being retired to the KLM UK Engineering Technical College at Norwich Airport.

United States

- 10367 — F27-500 is on static display at the Hickory Aviation Museum in Hickory, North Carolina. It was previously operated as N705FE by FedEx.

== Specifications (F.27) ==
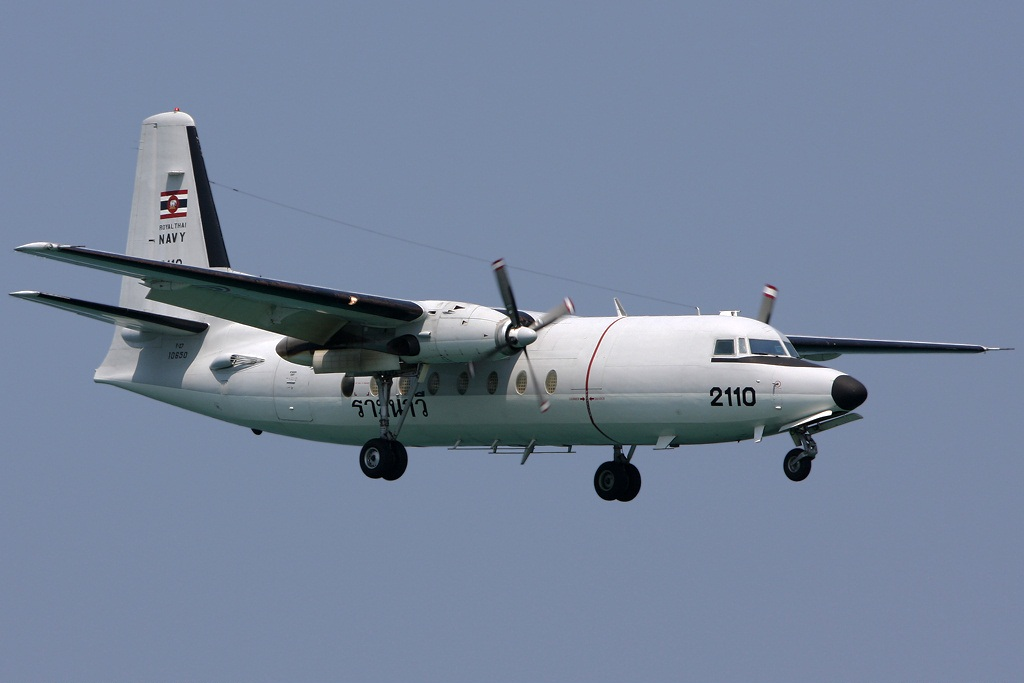
F27-400M of Thai Navy in 2012.

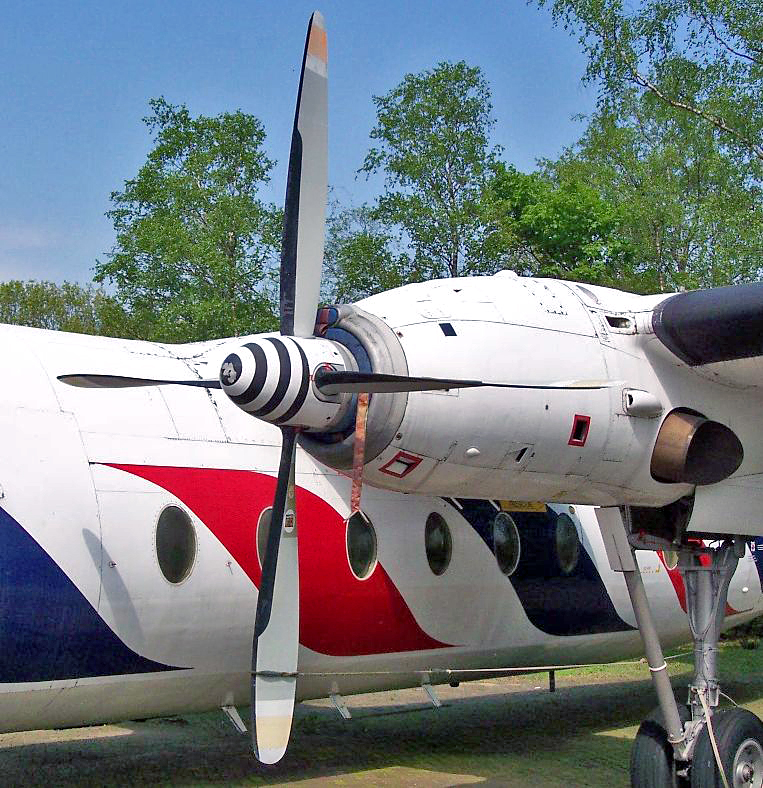
F27 Rolls Royce Dart

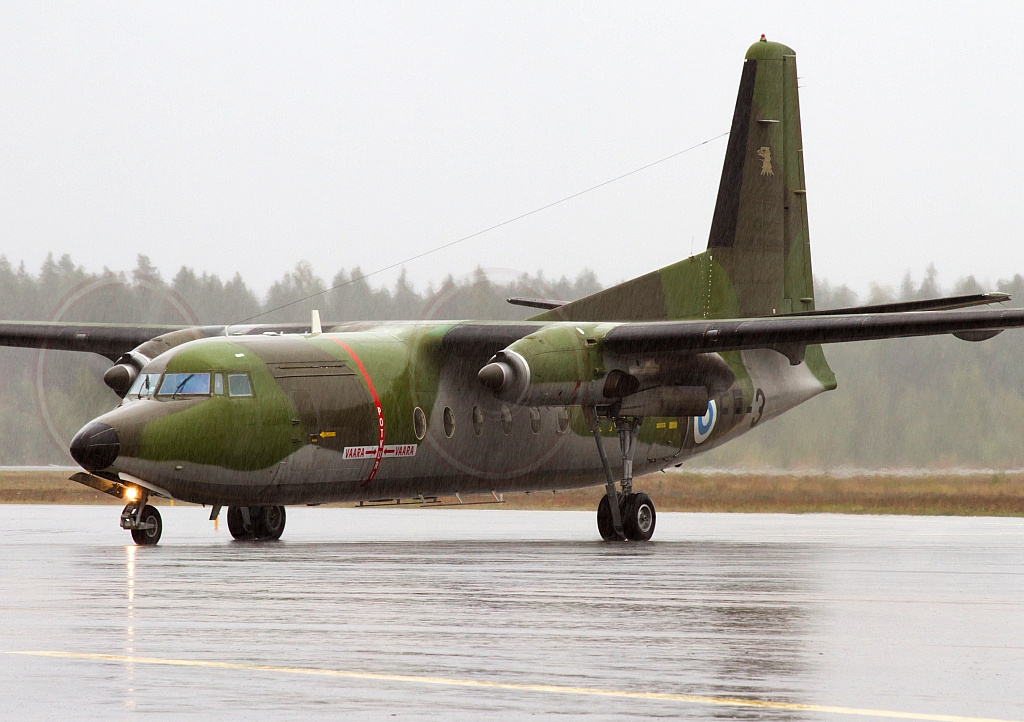
Finnish Air Force F-27-400M at Joensuu Airport

Data from The Observers Book of Aircraft

General characteristics

- Crew: 2 or 3
- Capacity: 44-52 passengers
- Length: 25.06 m (82 ft 3 in)
- Wingspan: 29 m (95 ft 2 in)
- Height: 8.71 m (28 ft 7 in)
- Wing area: 70 m^{2} (750 sq ft)
- Empty weight: 11,204 kg (24,701 lb)
- Max takeoff weight: 19,773 kg (43,592 lb)
- Powerplant: 2 × Rolls-Royce Dart Mk.532-7 two-stage centrifugal compressor turboprop, 1,678 kW (2,250 hp) each

Performance

- Cruise speed: 460 km/h (290 mph, 250 kn)
- Range: 2,600 km (1,600 mi, 1,400 nmi)
- Rate of climb: 7.37 m/s (1,451 ft/min)

== See also ==
Related development

- Fairchild Hiller FH-227
- Fokker 50

Aircraft of comparable role, configuration, and era

- Aérospatiale N 262
- Antonov An-24
- Handley Page Dart Herald
- Hawker Siddeley HS 748

Related lists

- List of civil aircraft
- List of military aircraft of the United States
