= Pakistan International Airlines Flight 404 =

1989 aircraft disappearance

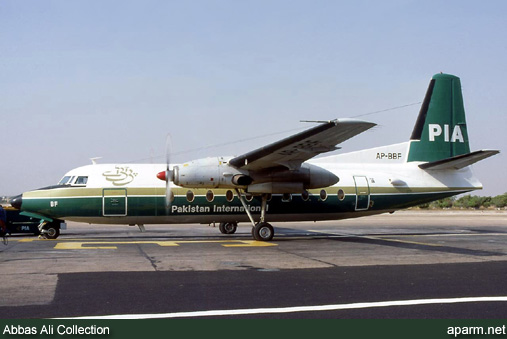
- AP-BBF, the aircraft involved in the accident, in Karachi in 1984

Incident
- Date: 25 August 1989
- Summary: Missing; presumed crashed
- Site: Himalaya Mountains, Pakistan (presumed); 35°14′12.87″N 74°35′24.22″E

Aircraft
- Aircraft type: Fokker F27 Friendship
- Operator: Pakistan International Airlines
- IATA flight No.: PK404
- ICAO flight No.: PIA404
- Call sign: PAKISTAN 404
- Registration: AP-BBF
- Flight origin: Gilgit Airport, Pakistan
- Destination: Islamabad International Airport, Pakistan
- Occupants: 54
- Passengers: 49
- Crew: 5
- Fatalities: 54 (presumed)
- Missing: 54
- Survivors: 0 (presumed)

Pakistan International Airlines Flight 404 (Urdu: پی آئی اے پرواز 404) was a Fokker F27 Friendship that disappeared shortly after takeoff on 25 August 1989. The aircraft presumably crashed somewhere in the Himalayas, Pakistan. All 54 people on board were lost and presumed dead.

== Disappearance ==
At 07:36, the flight took off from the northern city of Gilgit, Pakistan, on its way to the national capital Islamabad. One of the pilots of the aircraft made a routine radio call at 07:40; this was the last communication with the aircraft. The aircraft is thought to have crashed in the Himalayas, but the wreckage has never been found. Some conspiracists claimed that the aircraft was shot down by India after it crossed the Line of Control, though there is no evidence supporting this.

== Aircraft ==
The aircraft was a Fokker F27-200 Friendship turboprop airliner, serial number 10207, built in 1962 and registered as AP-BBF. It had accumulated approximately 44,524 hours of flying time; and 41,524 cycles (the number of times the aircraft had been pressurized) at the time of the accident.

== Search operation ==
After the disappearance, several aerial search missions were launched by the Pakistani military using C-130s and search helicopters during the first three or four days. The Indian Air Force also launched an operation on the Indian side of the LOC. Later, land search parties were organized, comprising civilian and armed forces personnel. These searched the area around the 8,000-metre-high (26,000 ft) mountain Nanga Parbat, but found nothing.

== In popular culture ==
In an eerie coincidence, the disappearance of Flight 404 parallels the famous internet HTTP 404 code. Both refer to a missing subject, just as a server returns an error (404 "Page Not Found") when a file cannot be found, Flight 404 vanished into the Himalayas and was never found or located.

== See also ==
- List of missing aircraft
- List of aviation accidents
