= June 1987 Burma Airways Fokker F27 crash =

Aviation accident in Burma

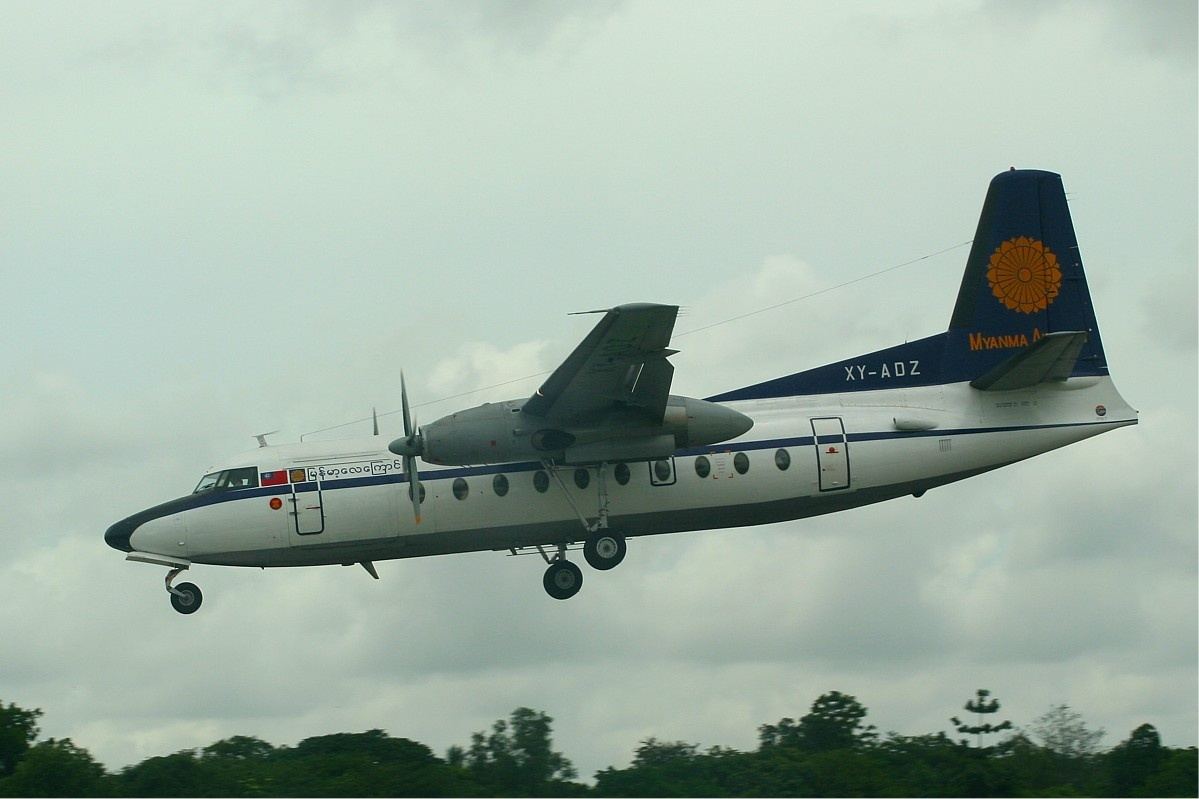
- A Myanmar Airways Fokker F-27 similar to the one involved

Accident
- Date: 21 June 1987
- Summary: Crashed into terrain
- Site: near Heho, Burma

Aircraft
- Aircraft type: Fokker F-27 Friendship 200
- Operator: Burma Airways
- Registration: XY-ADP
- Flight origin: Heho Airport, Heho, Burma
- Destination: Monghsat Airport, Mong Hsat, Burma
- Occupants: 45
- Passengers: 41
- Crew: 4
- Fatalities: 45
- Survivors: 0

On 21 June 1987, a Fokker F-27 200 operated by Burma Airways crashed near Hopong, Burma. The flight was carrying 45 occupants from Heho Airport to Monghsat Airport. The aircraft struck an 8,500 ft (2,600 m) mountain about 15 minutes after takeoff, killing everyone on board. On the flight were 36 adult passengers, 5 children and 4 crew.

== See also ==
- October 1987 Burma Airways Fokker F27 crash
