= October 1987 Burma Airways Fokker F27 crash =

1987 aviation accident

1987 Burma Airways Fokker F27 crash
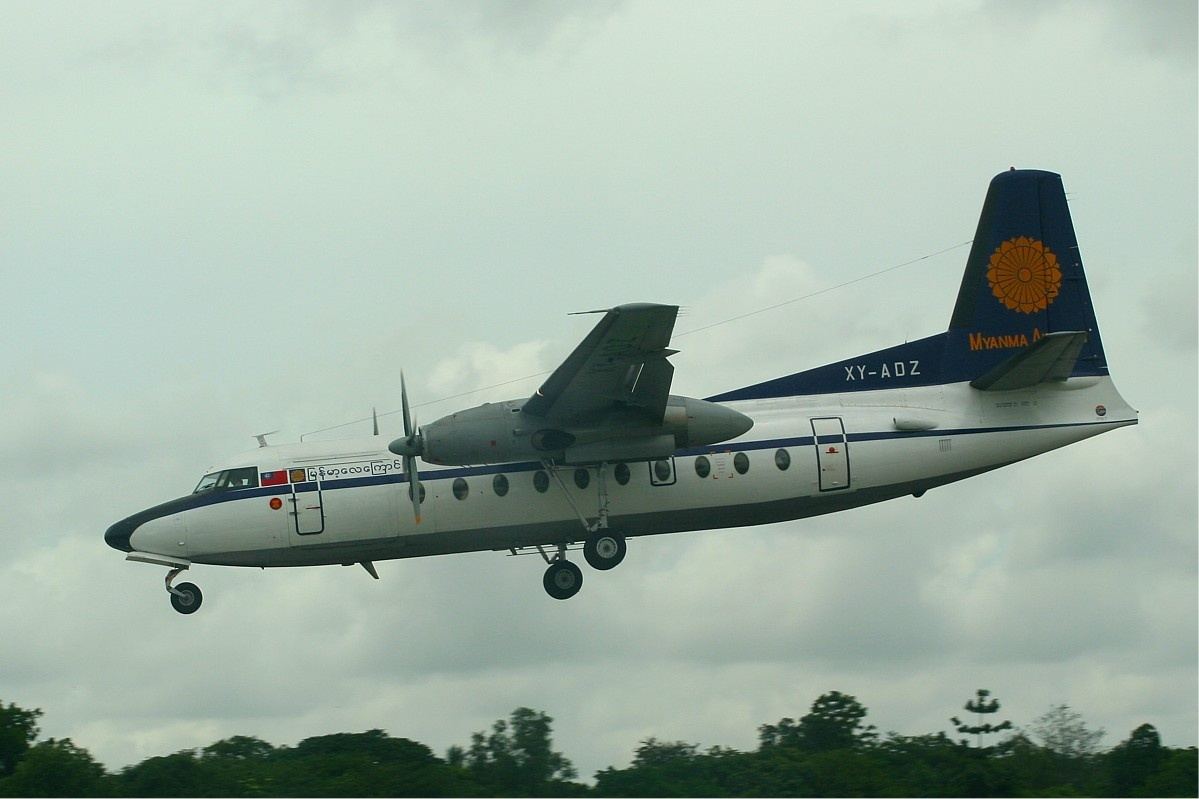
- A Myanmar Airways Fokker F-27 similar to the one involved.

Accident
- Date: 11 October 1987
- Summary: Controlled flight into terrain
- Site: near Pagan, Burma, Myanmar

Aircraft
- Aircraft type: Fokker F-27 Friendship
- Operator: Burma Airways
- Registration: XY-AEL
- Flight origin: Rangoon Airport, Rangoon, Burma
- Destination: Nyaung U Airport, Pagan, Burma
- Occupants: 49
- Passengers: 45
- Crew: 4
- Fatalities: 49
- Survivors: 0

On 11 October 1987, a Fokker F27 operated by Burma Airways crashed while en route to Pagan from Rangoon, Burma. The regularly scheduled domestic flight was carrying 49 passengers and crew. The aircraft struck a hillside south of Nyaung U Airport, killing everyone on board. It was the second fatal crash involving Burma Airways in four months.

== Aircraft and flight ==
The accident aircraft was a Fokker F27 Friendship powered by two Rolls-Royce Dart 532-7R turboprop engines. It was manufactured in 1985 with the serial number XY-AEL. Prior to the crash, it had 3,958 of flight hours across 3,799 flights.

The routinely scheduled domestic flight from Rangoon to Pagan covered a distance of about 300 miles (480 km). On the day of the crash, the plane carried 4 crew and 45 passengers. Among the 36 foreign nationals on board 14 were Americans; 7 Swiss, 5 British, 4 Australians, 3 Germans, 2 French and 1 Thai. Thirteen occupants, including the crew, and a baby, were Burmese nationals. Of the 12 American victims identified, least eight were residents of California; 2 each from New Orleans and Santa Fe.

== Accident ==
About 10 minutes before the plane was expected to land, radio communication with the tower ceased. The plane crashed into a ridge at an altitude of 1,500 ft (460 m) during its approach to Nyaung U Airport about 32 kilometres (20 mi) away. At the time, visibility was low due to heavy monsoon rain. Everyone on board was killed. According to a Rangoon radio report, the crash occurred after an in-flight fire near the village of Phanaung, while other news agencies said they could not establish if the fire occurred before or after the plane crashed. It was the second fatal crash involving Burma Airways in 1987; on 21 June, another Fokker F27 crashed after departing Heho, killing all 45 on board.

== Aftermath ==
The accident aircraft's next scheduled destination after landing at Pagan was Mandalay. After it crashed, passengers expecting the flight traveled to the city via buses.

A spokesperson for the United States Department of State citing a Burmese investigation team at the crash site said there was "no evidence of an in-flight explosion, fire or sabotage." She added that the likely cause was a stall from attempting to land too early, and the pilots attempted to recover from but the aircraft lost power and crashed.

Due to the crash occurring outside the city area, accessibility was difficult as local residents reached the crash site before the police. The local residents began looting. The local police brought the bodies to the airport. According to an official at the United States Embassy in Rangoon, the bodies were in poor condition, most decapitated or had lost their hands, making identification difficult. The bodies of all 49 on board were retrieved, and a flight was arranged to transport the remains back to Rangoon on 12 October.
