= 1972 in aviation =

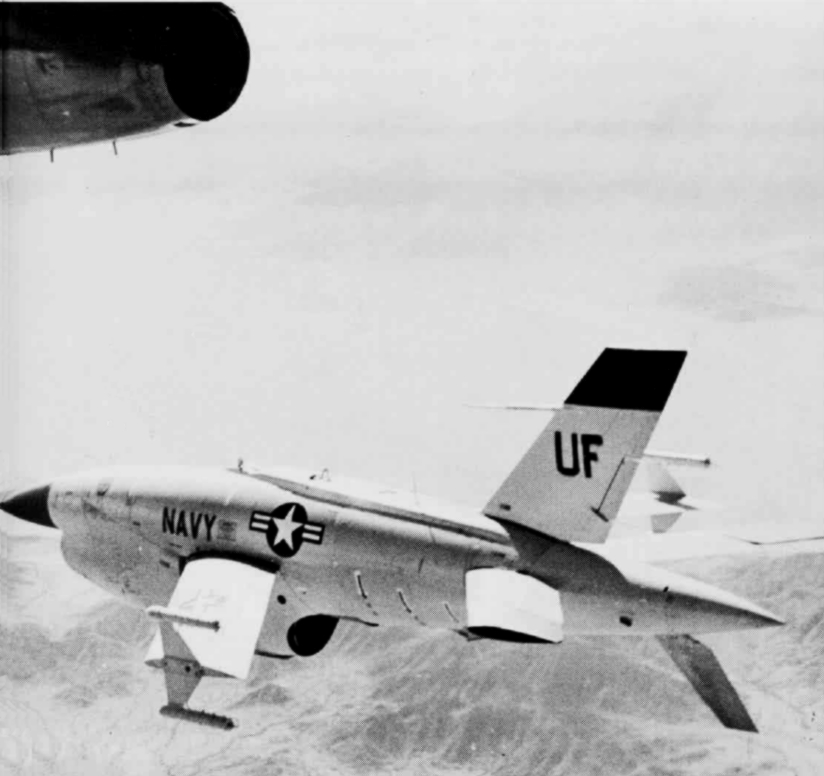
A United States Navy Teledyne Ryan BQM-34A Firebee unmanned aerial vehicle in flight just after its release by a DC-130A Hercules of Fleet Composite Squadron 3 (VC-3) in 1972.

This is a list of aviation-related events from 1972.

== Events ==
- Early in the year, the United States introduces the Walleye II optically guided glide bomb into service, employing it in the Vietnam War. It becomes known as the "Fat Albert."

=== January ===
- The last elements of the U.S. Army's 101st Airborne Division (Airmobile) are withdrawn from Vietnam.
- The Aeritalia company, formed in November 1969, becomes fully operational.
- January 4
  - Biman Bangladesh Airlines is founded.
  - Having lost its last aircraft in a crash 11 days earlier, the Peruvian airline LANSA runs out of operating funds and goes out of business. It had been founded in 1963.
- January 5 – President Richard M. Nixon announces $US 5.5 billion in funding for the Space Shuttle program.
- January 7 – As Pacific Southwest Airlines Flight 902, a Boeing 727-200 with 151 people on board, prepares to land at Los Angeles, California, after a flight from San Francisco, two individuals and their infant son hijack the airliner. They demand to be flown to Africa, but agree to be flown to Cuba instead when they are informed the plane lacks the range to cross the Atlantic Ocean. The captain negotiates the release of the passengers in Los Angeles, after which the plane carries its crew, the hijackers, and three off-duty flight attendants to Cuba via a refueling stop at Tampa, Florida. In Cuba, the hijackers return control of the aircraft to the captain.
- January 12 – Billy Gene Hurst Jr., hijacks Braniff Flight 38, a Boeing 727 with 102 other people on board, during a flight from Houston to Dallas. After arrival at Love Field in Dallas, he releases the other 94 passengers but holds all seven crew members hostage, demanding to be flown to South America during a standoff with police. Eventually, the entire crew escapes, and police storm the airliner and arrest him.
- January 19 – Flying a United States Navy F-4J Phantom II fighter of Fighter Squadron 96 (VF-96) off of the attack aircraft carrier USS Constellation (CVA-64), Lieutenant Randy "Duke" Cunningham (pilot) and Lieutenant (Junior Grade) William "Irish" Driscoll (radar intercept officer) shoot down a North Vietnamese MiG 21 fighter. It is the first air-to-air victory by an American aircraft over Vietnam since March 1970.
- January 20 – Two months after the celebrated hijacking of Northwest Orient Flight 305 by an unidentified man who becomes popularly known as "D. B. Cooper", Hughes Airwest Flight 800 becomes the target of a copycat hijacker. After boarding at McCarran International Airport in Las Vegas, Nevada, 23-year-old Richard Charles La Point claims he has a bomb while the plane is on the taxiway and demands US$50,000 in cash, two parachutes, and a helmet. When his demands are met, La Point releases 51 Reno, Nevada-bound passengers and two flight attendants, after which the DC-9 takes off and flies eastward toward Denver, Colorado, followed by two United States Air Force F-111 fighters. Without a coat and in cowboy boots, La Point bales out via the plane's lower aft door over the Eastern Plains in northeastern Colorado in mid-afternoon. The parachutes he had been given were high-visibility ones secretly equipped with emergency locater devices, and he sprains his ankle on landing, making it impossible for him to move; he is apprehended a few hours later, with minor injuries and very cold. The plane, with two pilots and a flight attendant on board, lands safely at Denver's Stapleton International Airport at 2:55 pm MST. Facing potential death penalty charges for air piracy, La Point will be sentenced to 40 years in prison, but will serve less than eight and be released from a halfway house in 1979.
- January 23 – The United States suspects that SA-3 Goa surface-to-air missiles have become operational in North Vietnam.
- January 26
  - JAT Yugoslav Airlines Flight 367, a McDonnell Douglas DC-9-32, explodes in flight at 33,330 feet (10,160 m), breaks into two pieces, and crashes near Srbská Kamenice, Czechoslovakia, killing at least 27 of the 28 people on board. The sole survivor, flight attendant Vesna Vulović, sets a record that still stands for surviving the longest fall without a parachute.
  - A hijacker commandeers Mohawk Airlines Flight 452 – a Fairchild Hiller FH-227B with 47 people on board flying from Albany, New York, to New York City – and demands a ransom. He forces the airliner to land at Dutchess County Airport outside Poughkeepsie, New York, where he is shot and killed while trying to escape in a getaway car.
- January 27 – Civil aviation in Canada is halted by a strike by air traffic controllers.
- January 28 – Singapore Airlines was founded.
- January 29 – Garrett Brock Trapnell hijacks a Trans World Airlines airliner during a flight from Los Angeles, to New York City and demands US$306,000, the release from prison of militant Angela Davis, and a conversation with President Richard Nixon. A Federal Bureau of Investigation agent shoots and disarms him, and he is imprisoned. In separate incidents in 1978, his wife Barbara Ann Oswald will die in an attempt to free him using a hijacked helicopter and his daughter Robin Oswald will hijack another airliner in a failed attempt to get him released.

=== February ===
- Aeronaves de México changes its name to Aeroméxico.
- Off the coast of Maine, a U.S. Navy air mine countermeasures unit participates in an amphibious warfare exercise for the first time.
- February 4 – Biman Bangladesh Airlines began flight operations, using a single Douglas DC-3 to provide domestic services.
- February 5
  - Aeroflot and Lufthansa jointly open services between Moscow in the Soviet Union and Frankfurt-am-Main, West Germany.
  - The U.S. National Aeronautics and Space Administration (NASA) and de Havilland Canada extensively modify a C-8 Buffalo for short takeoff and landing (STOL) experiments.
- February 10 – Biman Bangladesh Airlines' only plane, a Douglas DC-3, crashes during a test flight less than a week after it began flight operations.
- February 19 – A male passenger armed with a hand grenade attempts to hijack an Alia Sud Aviation SE-210 Caravelle with 37 people on board flying from Cairo, Egypt, to Amman, Jordan, and demands to be flown to Libya. Two security guards on board the airliner overpower him, and the plane lands safely at Amman.
- February 22 – Lufthansa Flight 649, a Boeing 747-200 flying from Tokyo, Japan, to Frankfurt-am-Main, West Germany, is hijacked during the New Delhi, India-Athens, Greece, leg of the flight and forced to divert to Aden in the People's Democratic Republic of Yemen, where all 182 passengers and crew are released the next day in exchange for a $5 million ransom.

=== March ===
- March 3 – Mohawk Airlines Flight 405, a Fairchild Hiller FH-227, crashes into a house while on final approach to Albany County Airport (later Albany International Airport) in Albany, New York, killing 16 of the 48 people on the plane and injuring all but one of the 32 survivors. The crash also kills one person and injures three others on the ground.
- March 4 – Biman Bangladesh Airlines inaugurates its first international route, using a single Boeing 707 to provide service between Bangladesh and London.
- March 7
  - At Tampa International Airport in Florida, Edmund McKee pulls a revolver on a National Airlines ticket agent helping passengers board National Airlines Flight 67 – a Boeing 727 with 24 people aboard – and takes the agent hostage, saying he wants to hijack the jetliner. He is escorted aboard and demands to fly to Sweden. The captain informs McKee that the airliner lacks the range to cross the Atlantic Ocean, then convinces him to release all of the passengers and to step outside to continue negotiations. Once McKee exits the aircraft, security personnel overpower and arrest him.
  - As a Chalk's International Airlines Grumman G-73 Mallard refuels at Watson Island, Florida, during a flight from Miami to Bimini with five passengers and a crew of two, Joseph Terron Bennett and James William Brewton of the Black Liberation Army hijack it and demand to be flown to Cuba. A Chalk's mechanic gets a pistol out of his car, intending to shoot out the plane's tires, but the hijackers shoot and wound him. After the pilot refuses to start the engines, the hijackers shoot him also, and he jumps from the aircraft followed by one passenger. With four passengers still aboard, Bennett and Brewton force the copilot to fly them to Havana, which – after bumping into a Grumman Goose parked beside it at Watson Island – the Mallard barely reaches with its fuel tank almost empty. Cuban authorities arrest the two hijackers and allow the Mallard and its passengers and copilot to fly back to the United States the next day. Brewton will be killed during an armed robbery in Jamaica in 1975, while Bennett will return to the United States secretly in 1982 and will not be arrested there until 1983.
- March 9 – American aircraft record their 100th protective reaction strike of the Vietnam War against enemy surface-to-air missile and antiaircraft artillery sites.
- March 11 – A hijacker commanders an Alitalia Sud Aviation SE-210 Caravelle flying from Rome to Milan, Italy, with 36 people on board and forces it to fly to Munich, West Germany.
- March 12 – Tunisair takes delivery of its first Boeing aircraft, a Boeing 727-200.
- March 14 – Sterling Airways Flight 296, a Sud Aviation Caravelle, crashes into a mountain ridge near Kalba in the United Arab Emirates, killing all 112 people on board. It remains the deadliest aviation accident in the history of that nation.
- March 19 – EgyptAir Flight 763, a McDonnell Douglas DC-9-32, crashes into the highest peak of Aden Crater, an extinct volcano, while on approach to land at Aden International Airport, killing all 30 people on board. It remains the deadliest civil aviation accident in the history of Yemen.
- Late March – The commander-in-chief of the Soviet Air Force visits North Vietnam, apparently leading to improved North Vietnamese air defense tactics that will be observed between April and September.
- March 31 – In response to the North Vietnamese "Easter Offensive" against South Vietnam that began on March 30, the United States begins a series of deployments code-named "Constant Guard", in which a large number of U.S. Air Force and U.S. Marine Corps squadrons return to bases in South Vietnam and Thailand and the U.S. Navy aircraft carrier presence at Yankee Station in the Gulf of Tonkin increases from two on March 30 to six by late spring.

=== April ===
- April 1
  - BOAC and BEA merge to create British Airways.
  - Tunisair inaugurates service on the Tunis–London route, using a leased Boeing 707.
- April 2 – United States Air Force Lieutenant Colonel Iceal "Gene" Hamilton is the only survivor of the six-man crew of his EB-66 Destroyer after a North Vietnamese Army S-75 Dvina (NATO reporting name "SA-2 Guideline") surface-to-air missile shoots it down near the Demilitarized Zone in Vietnam. His survival triggers the largest, longest, and most complicated combat search and rescue operation of the Vietnam War. General Creighton Abrams calls off air operations on 8 April without either Hamilton or First Lieutenant Mark Clark, a forward air controller shot down during the rescue attempt, being rescued; a South Vietnamese commando team led by a United States Navy SEAL officer finally rescues Hamilton and Clark a few days later in a land-water operation. The 11-day operation has involved A-1 Skyraiders, OV-10 Broncos, and UH-1H Iroquois and HH-53 Jolly Green Giant helicopters – with one of the latter shot down, killing its entire crew of six – and cost 11 men killed and two captured, and five aircraft destroyed and numerous others damaged.
- April 5 – A hijacker demanding money takes control of a Merpati Nusantara Airlines Vickers Viscount making a domestic flight in Indonesia from Surabaya to Jakarta. The airliner lands at Yogyakarta, Indonesia, where the hijacker is taken down. There is one fatality during the hijacking.
- April 7
  - American aircraft resume regular bombing of North Vietnam in response to the North Vietnamese "Easter Offensive" invasion of South Vietnam.
  - Wearing a fake moustache and a black wig, 29-year-old Richard McCoy hijacks United Airlines Flight 885 – a Boeing 727 flying from Denver, Colorado, to Los Angeles, California, with 91 people on board – claiming to be armed with two pistols, a hand grenade, and plastic explosives and demanding a ransom of US$500,000 in exchange for the lives of the passengers and crew. The airliner diverts to San Francisco, California, where McCoy receives the ransom money. He then orders it to take off and fly eastward in a zigzag pattern and parachutes from the plane somewhere near Provo, Utah. The following day, the Utah National Guard unit for which he pilots helicopters, participates in the search for him, and police soon identify and apprehend him. Jailed for the crime, McCoy will escape from prison in August 1974 and die in a shootout with U.S. Federal Bureau of Investigation (FBI) agents in November 1974.
- April 8 – Two hijackers commandeer a Faucett Perú Boeing 727 making a domestic flight in Peru from Piura to Chiclayo. They are taken down.
- April 9 – Thirty-one-year-old Stanley Harlan Speck hijacks Pacific Southwest Airlines Flight 942 – a Boeing 727 flying from Oakland to San Diego, California, with 92 people on board – demanding US$500,000, two parachutes, and a flight to Miami, Florida. After the airliner lands in San Diego, the captain tricks Speck into exiting the plane to collect navigation charts necessary for the flight. When Speck does, U.S. Federal Bureau of Investigation agents disguised as mechanics overpower him.
- April 11 – Waving a bottle he says contains nitroglycerine and claiming to have a grievance against the United States Government, 56-year-old Major Burton Davenport hijacks Continental Airlines Flight 781 – a Boeing 707 – as it prepares to take off from Portland, Oregon, for a flight to Seattle, Washington. He orders the cabin temperature to be maintained at 70 degrees F (21.1 degrees C) and demands a small plastic bucket half-full of dry, clean sawdust, a dozen hand grenades, and a ransom of US$500,000, to be paid by the United States Treasury and not by Continental Airlines. A stewardess talks him into releasing all the passengers, and Davenport abruptly surrenders to an FBI negotiator about an hour after that.
- April 13 – Using an unloaded .22-caliber pistol, 36-year-old Ricardo Chavez-Ortiz hijacks Frontier Airlines Flight 91, a Boeing 737-200 flying from Albuquerque, New Mexico, to Phoenix, Arizona, with 31 people on board, and orders it to fly past Phoenix and land at Los Angeles, California, where he plans to make a statement about injustices he had experienced in the United States since immigrating from Mexico. At Los Angeles International Airport, he released the passengers and, after journalists come aboard the airliner, makes a 34-minute speech while wearing a pilot's hat, complaining about police brutality, racism, and education policy. Then he hands his gun to the plane's pilot, apologizes for the day's inconvenience, and surrenders quietly.
- April 16
  - President Richard Nixon's administration lifts most restrictions on bombing North Vietnam, and U.S. Air Force B-52 Stratofortresses bomb targets near Haiphong for the first time since 1968.
  - A hijacker commandeers Prinair Flight 179, a de Havilland Heron making a flight in Puerto Rico from Ponce to San Juan; the hijacker is taken down and there are no fatalities or injuries.
- April 17
  - The Soviet Union claims that American airstrikes have damaged four of its merchant ships in Haiphong Harbor.
  - Claiming to have a bomb that is actually only a box of cigars, 30-year-old Mario Maimone hijacks a Swissair Douglas DC-9-32 flying from Geneva, Switzerland, to Rome, Italy, telling the flight crew that he is the reincarnation of "Jesus Christ, Superstar" and demanding to be flown to Argentina. Ultimately, he agrees to go to Rome instead, where he demands to speak to the Pope and the United States Ambassador to Italy, holds a brief press conference at which he bets reporters one U.S. dollar that he will not go to jail, and then surrenders.
  - Believing that he is personally responsible for expelling Satan from the Earth and that he must hijack an airliner and receive a ransom as part of that mission, 29-year-old William Herbert Green gives a note saying he has a gun and demanding $500,000 in cash and to fly to the Bahamas and hands it to a flight attendant aboard Delta Air Lines Flight 952 – a Convair CV-880-22-2 flying from Chicago, Illinois, to Miami, Florida, with 92 people on board – telling her to pass it to the captain. After 40 minutes of negotiations between the captain and Green, Green agrees to allow the plane to return to Chicago, where he releases all the passengers. The captain then tells Green that he can either fly to the Bahamas and be imprisoned there, where he knows no one, or surrender right there in Chicago. Green decides to surrender in Chicago.
  - A hijacker commandeers Alaska Airlines Flight 1861, a Boeing 727 with 92 people on board flying from Seattle, Washington, to Annette Island, Alaska. The hijacker eventually surrenders.
- April 18
  - Two passengers hijack a Slov-Air Let L-410A Turbolet with 16 people on board during a domestic flight in Czechoslovakia from Mariánské Lázně to Prague, demanding to be taken to West Germany. After they shoot and wound the copilot, the airliner diverts to Nuremberg, West Germany, where the hijackers request political asylum.
  - East African Airways Flight 720 aborts takeoff at Bole International Airport in Addis Ababa, Ethiopia, headed for Rome; it then overruns the runway, breaks up, and catches fire. 43 of the 107 passengers and crew aboard are killed.
- April 19 – North Vietnamese Air Force aircraft bomb U.S. Navy ships at sea, the only such attack during the Vietnam War. Two MiG-17s cause minor damage to the guided-missile light cruiser USS Oklahoma City (CLG-5) and heavy damage to the destroyer USS Higbee (DD-806).
- April 24 – Two UH-1B attack helicopters arrive at Tan Son Nhut Air Base in South Vietnam, becoming the first helicopters equipped with the TOW antitank missile to enter combat.
- April 25 – Hans-Werner Grosse sets a new sailplane distance record of 1,460 km (910 mi) in a Schleicher ASW 12.
- April 27 – Four United States Air Force F-4 Phantom IIs finally destroy the Thanh Hóa Railroad and Highway Bridge in North Vietnam with laser-guided bombs. The bridge had withstood 873 American sorties against it since April 1965.
- April 29 – A Strela 2 (NATO reporting name "SA-7 Grail") surface-to-air missile shoots down an aircraft for the first time in the Vietnam War.

=== May ===
- President of Cuba Fidel Castro suspends the "Freedom Flights" program, which since December 1965 has carried Cubans wishing to leave Cuba to the United States, using flights by commercial aircraft that depart Cuba twice a day, five days a week. The flights will not resume until December 1972.
- Universal Airlines goes bankrupt. Saturn Airways receives its assets.
- LANICA begins four-engine jet service between Nicaragua and Miami, Florida, using four Convair CV-880s.
- May 3 – Four hijackers take control of a Turkish Airlines Douglas DC-9-32 with 66 people on board during a domestic flight in Turkey from Ankara to Istanbul, demanding the release of prisoners. The airliner diverts to Sofia, Bulgaria, where the hijackers surrender to authorities.
- May 5
  - Alitalia Flight 112, a Douglas DC-8-43, crashes into Mount Longa, about 5 km (3.1 mi) southwest of Palermo, Sicily, while on approach to Palermo, killing all 115 people on board. It remains the single deadliest aircraft accident in Italy's history.
  - Recently drafted into the United States Army, desperate to avoid serving in the Vietnam War, and claiming to be a member of a paramilitary group fighting against U.S. imperialism, 21-year-old Michael Lynn Hansen pulls out a .38-caliber Smith & Wesson revolver aboard Western Airlines Flight 407 – a Boeing 737-200 with 81 people on board flying from Salt Lake City, Utah, to Los Angeles, California – and demands that it fly him to North Vietnam. After the plane lands in Los Angeles, where he releases 11 passengers, he changes his mind and orders it to fly him to Cuba. The plane stops for 50 minutes at Tampa, Florida, to refuel, then proceeds to Havana, Cuba, where Hansen asks Cuban soldiers who come aboard the airliner to get his luggage for him. Instead, they arrest him. He will be imprisoned in Cuba until 1975, when he will return to the United States.
  - Forty-nine-year-old Frederick Hahneman hijacks Eastern Airlines Flight 175 – a Boeing 727 with 55 people on board flying from Allentown, Pennsylvania, to Washington Dulles International Airport in Virginia – and demands a ransom of US$303,000 and six parachutes. After the airliner lands at Washington Dulles, he receives the ransom, then orders the plane to take off again. It stops at New Orleans, Louisiana, then continues south to Central America. Over Honduras, Hahneman parachutes from the plane into the jungle below. He will turn himself in at the United States Embassy in Tegucigalpa, Honduras, a month later, refusing to divulge what he did with the money.
- May 8
  - U.S. Navy attack aircraft from the attack aircraft carrier USS Coral Sea (CVA-43) begin to lay naval mines in major North Vietnamese ports.
  - Covering U.S. Navy A-6 Intruder and A-7 Corsair II aircraft laying mines in Haiphong Harbor, the U.S. Navy guided-missile cruiser USS Chicago (CG-11) shoots down a North Vietnamese MiG-21 (NATO reporting name "Fishbed") at a range of 48 nautical miles (55 statute miles; 89 km) with a RIM-8 Talos surface-to-air missile. It is the last of three aircraft destroyed by Talos missiles during the Vietnam War, and the first since 1968.
  - Four members of Black September hijack Sabena Flight 571, a Boeing 707 with 86 other people on board flying from Vienna, Austria, to Tel Aviv, Israel. After the plane arrives as scheduled at Lod Airport in Lod, Israel, the hijackers threaten to blow up the plane if Israel does not release 315 Palestinians from prison. The next day, 16 Israeli Sayeret Matkal commandos led by Ehud Barak and including Benjamin Netanyahu, storm the plane in Operation Isotope, killing two hijackers and capturing the other two; Netanyahu and three passengers are wounded and one of the wounded passengers later dies of her wounds.
- May 9 – In Operation Pocket Money, U.S. Navy A-6 Intruder and A-7 Corsair II bombers from three aircraft carriers lay naval mines in the harbors at Haiphong and six other North Vietnamese ports.
- May 10 – The single biggest day of aerial combat of the Vietnam War takes place. U.S. Air Force aircraft shoot down three North Vietnamese fighters and U.S. Navy F-4 Phantom II fighters shoot down eight more. Flying a U.S. Navy F-4J Phantom II of Fighter Squadron 96 (VF-96) off of USS Constellation, Lieutenants Randy "Duke" Cunningham (pilot) and William "Irish" Driscoll (radar intercept officer) shoot down three MiG-17 fighters, becoming first American aces, and the U.S. Navy's only aces, of the Vietnam War. They receive the Navy Cross for heroism during the flight.
- May 10–11 – F-4 Phantom IIs of the U.S. Air Force's 8th Tactical Fighter Wing hit the Paul Doumer Bridge in Hanoi, North Vietnam, with precision-guided munitions, closing it to traffic.
- May 12 – SA-7 Grail surface-to-air missiles shoot down five American AH-1 Cobra attack helicopters in five minutes near An Lộc, South Vietnam.
- May 14 – Two American UH-1B attack helicopters using TOW missiles blunt a major North Vietnamese attack near Kon Tum, South Vietnam.
- May 16 – Unaware that their plane's barometric altimeter is displaying an incorrect altitude that is higher than their actual altitude, the crew of a Soviet Navy Antonov An-24T (NATO reporting name "Coke") descends to a dangerously low level in thick fog while flying along the coast of Kaliningrad Oblast in the Soviet Union. The plane's wing strikes a tree, and the plane crashes into a kindergarten in Svetlogorsk. All eight people on the plane die, as do two adults and either 23 or 25 children (according to different sources) on the ground.
- May 18
  - As Aeroflot Flight 1491, an Antonov An-10A (registration CCCP-11215), descends from its cruising altitude to 5,000 feet (1,500 meters) prior to landing at Kharkov in the Soviet Union's Ukrainian Soviet Socialist Republic, both of its wings separate due to metal fatigue in the wing center section. The airliner crashes in a wooded area 24 kilometers (15 miles) from Kharkov Airport, but does not catch fire. All 122 people on board die. The accident is the worst ever involving an An-10 and at the time is the deadliest aviation accident in the history of Ukraine, and Aeroflot withdraws the An-10 from service because of it.
  - Eastern Air Lines Flight 346, a Douglas DC-9, crashes on landing at Fort Lauderdale/Hollywood International Airport in Broward County, Florida, and catches fire. No one is killed, but all 10 people on board are injured.
- May 19 – U.S. Air Force and U.S. Navy aircraft begin Operation Linebacker, a campaign of airstrikes on North Vietnam targeting the transportation of supplies in support of the North Vietnamese "Easter Offensive" invasion of South Vietnam.
- May 21 – A DTA Fokker F27 Friendship on a domestic flight in Angola from Luanda to Lobito crashes into the Atlantic Ocean 3 kilometers (1.9 miles) northwest of Lobito Airport while on approach in poor visibility, killing 22 of the 25 people on board.
- May 23 – About 10 minutes after an Ecuatoriana de Aviacion Lockheed L-188 Electra takes off from Quito, Ecuador, for a domestic flight to Guayaquil, a passenger identified from the passenger manifest only by his surname, Lomas, hijacks the airliner, claiming he has a bomb. The plane lands at Quito, where Lomas demands US$40,000 and a parachute in exchange for the lives of the other passengers and crew. During the sixth hour of negotiations, a squad of commandos sneaks into the plane through its baggage compartment, ambushes Lomas, and kills him with machine gun fire.
- May 24 – Two hijackers seize control of a South African Airways Boeing 727 with 55 people aboard flying from Salisbury, Rhodesia, to Johannesburg, South Africa. The airliner diverts to Blantyre, Malawi, where security forces storm the airliner and arrest the hijackers the following day.
- May 26
  - The United States and Soviet Union sign the SALT-1 strategic arms limitation treaty.
  - Cessna builds its 100,000th aircraft, the first company in the world to achieve this figure.
  - Two American UH-1B attack helicopters use TOW antitank missiles to destroy 12 North Vietnamese tanks outside Kon Tum, South Vietnam, allowing South Vietnamese forces to counterattack and secure the city.
- May 28 – A hijacker commandeers an Olympic Airways Boeing 707 with 135 people aboard making a domestic flight in Greece from Heraklion to Athens, demanding medical treatment and an airline ticket to London. After the airliner arrives at Athens, security forces storm it and arrest the hijacker.
- May 30
  - Acting on behalf of the Popular Front for the Liberation of Palestine, three members of the Japanese Red Army attack passengers at Lod Airport in Tel Aviv, Israel, with assault rifles and hand grenades, killing 26 people and injuring 80. Among the dead is Professor Aharon Katzir, an internationally renowned protein biophysicist and the brother of future President of Israel Ephraim Katzir. Two of the attackers are killed and the third, Kōzō Okamoto, is wounded and arrested.
  - Delta Air Lines Flight 9570, a McDonnell Douglas DC-9-14 on a training flight with no passengers on board, crashes during a landing approach at Greater Southwest International Airport in Fort Worth, Texas, killing all four people – three pilots and a Federal Aviation Administration inspector – aboard. The crash is blamed on wake turbulence from a Douglas DC-10 airliner that had preceded the DC-9, resulting in increased minimum distances being required for aircraft following heavy aircraft.
  - A hijacker demanding money seizes control of a Varig Lockheed L-188 Electra (registration PP-VJL) with 92 people aboard making a domestic flight in Brazil from São Paulo to Porto Alegre. At São Paulo–Congonhas Airport in São Paulo, security forces storm the airliner and kill the hijacker.

=== June ===
- Aircraft carrier trials of the U.S. Navy's Grumman F-14 Tomcat fighter begin aboard the attack aircraft carrier USS Forrestal (CVA-59).
- North Vietnam begins to use balloons with explosive charges.
- June 1 – Continental Airlines inaugurates Douglas DC-10 service.
- June 2
  - U.S. Air Force F-4E Phantom II pilot Phil "Hands" Handley scores the first and thus far only supersonic gun kill in history while engaging a pair of MiG-19 (NATO reporting name "Farmer") fighters over North Vietnam in support of a rescue operation to save F-4 Phantom II crewman Roger Locher, downed northeast of Hanoi 23 days earlier.
  - To protest American involvement in the Vietnam War and hoping to free Angela Davis from prison and transport her to political asylum in North Vietnam, Willie Roger Holder and his girlfriend, Catherine Marie Kerkow, hijack Western Airlines Flight 701, a Boeing 720B, as it approaches Seattle near the end of a flight from Los Angeles, claiming to have a bomb in an attaché case. They demand a ransom of US$500,000. After allowing all 97 passengers to get off in San Francisco, they fly to Algiers in Algeria, where they are granted political asylum. Later, $488,000 of the ransom money is returned to American officials.
  - Armed with a .357 Magnum revolver and carrying a parachute, 22-year-old Robb Heady barges onto United Airlines Flight 239 – a Boeing 727 with six people aboard at Reno, Nevada, preparing for a flight to San Francisco – and demands a $200,000 ransom. United Airlines borrows the money from two casinos, and Heady takes delivery of it on the tarmac while holding two flight attendants at gunpoint with their heads under a blanket, frustrating a U.S. Federal Bureau of Investigation (FBI) sniper who cannot distinguish their heads from Heady's. He then orders the plane to take off, but engine trouble prevents it from doing so. He boards another United Boeing 727, which does take off. As it flies over Nevada's Washoe Lake, Heady parachutes from the rear door, taking $155,000 of the ransom money with him. He drops the money during his descent and suffers injuries on landing. FBI agents arrest him early the next morning when he returns to his car, parked near the lake, which the FBI had staked out because it had a United States Parachute Association bumper sticker on it.
- June 3 – A United States Navy P-3A-60-LO Orion crashes into the side of a 2,700-foot (823-meter) mountain near Jebel Musa in Morocco, killing all 14 people on board.
- June 5 – On approach to land at Pleiku Airport in Pleiku, South Vietnam, an Air America C-46A-45-CU Commando crashes into a mountain 50 feet (15 meters) below its peak, killing all 32 people on board.
- June 8 – Two passengers, one armed with a gun, enter the cockpit of a Slov-Air Let L-410A Turbolet with 16 people on board during a domestic flight in Czechoslovakia from Mariánské Lázně to Prague, demanding to be taken to West Germany. They shoot and kill the pilot and threaten to shoot the copilot if he does not change course toward Munich, and the copilot tells them that the airliner lacks the range to reach Munich, but that he would fly into West Germany and land at the nearest large city in West Germany the plane can reach. Meanwhile, eight other passengers involved in the hijacking attack the four uninvolved passengers with bottles, to avoid any resistance from them in case one of them is a plainclothes security officer. After the hijackers see factory signs in German and Western cars on the roads below and are satisfied that the plane has reached West Germany, the copilot lands on a 600-meter (2,000-foot) airstrip at Weiding, West Germany. The hijackers – seven men and three women, one of them with an infant, escape, but they are later apprehended.
- June 11 – U.S. Air Force B-52 Stratofortresses destroy a major hydroelectric plant near Hanoi, North Vietnam, using laser-guided bombs.
- June 12 – The "Windsor Incident" occurs when American Airlines Flight 96, a Douglas DC-10-10, suffers an in-flight door failure at 11,750 feet (3,580 m) over Windsor, Ontario, Canada, resulting in cabin depressurization and several minor injuries to passengers. Despite corrective measures to improve the door-locking mechanism, a similar failure aboard another DC-10 will cause the disastrous crash of Turkish Airlines Flight 981.
- June 14 – Japan Airlines Flight 471, a Douglas DC-8-53, crashes on approach to Palam International Airport, in New Delhi, India, killing 82 of the 87 people on board, including Brazilian actress Leila Diniz. Three people on the ground also die.
- June 15 – A bomb explodes aboard Cathay Pacific Flight 700Z, a Convair CV-880-22M-21 flying at 29,000 feet (8,839 m) over Pleiku, South Vietnam. The aircraft disintegrates and crashes, killing all 81 people on board. No one ever is convicted of the bombing.
- June 16 – The International Federation of Air Line Pilots' Associations begins a 24-hour work stoppage at 2:00 a.m. EDT to protest the ongoing epidemic of airline hijackings. Aerlingus, Arkia, Air Canada, Air France, Air New Zealand, Alitalia, CP Air, Eastern Airlines, El Al, Lufthansa, Northeast Airlines, Norwegian Airlines, Sabena, Scandinavian Airlines System, and Swissair shut down, while pilots at Southern Airways return to work at 10:00 a.m. EDT after only an eight-hour stoppage. Czechoslovakia halts all commercial air traffic for one hour in support of the protest, and South African Airways cancels all international fights, although it continues domestic service in South Africa. In Vienna, Austria, airport ground crews walk off the job in sympathy with the protest, and at Panama City, Panama, cars block entrances to the airport. Lod International Airport outside Tel Aviv, Israel, closes, and most flights at airports in Canada are cancelled. Other airlines and airports around the world operate normally during the stoppage.
- June 18 – In the Staines Disaster, British European Airways Flight 548, a Hawker Siddeley Trident 1C, crashes at Staines-upon-Thames, England, less than three minutes after takeoff from London Heathrow Airport, killing all 118 people on board. It will be the deadliest aviation incident in the United Kingdom until December 1988.
- June 20 – Airline pilots hold a worldwide strike, calling for tighter security
- June 21 – French pilot Jean Boulet pilots an Aérospatiale SA-315 Lama to a world-record altitude for helicopters of 40,820 feet (12,440 meters); the record still stands. As he begins to descend, his engine flames out; unable to restart it, he safely autorotates all the way to the ground, thus also setting the record for the longest autorotation in history.
- June 23 – Traveling under the name "Robert Wilson" and armed with a submachine gun he smuggled aboard in a trombone case, 28-year-old Martin J. McNally commandeers American Airlines Flight 119 – a Boeing 727 with 101 people on board flying from St. Louis, Missouri, to Tulsa, Oklahoma – as it approaches Tulsa. He orders the airliner to return to St. Louis, demanding US$502,500 and five parachutes. He receives the money after the plane lands at Lambert–St. Louis International Airport in St. Louis. While the plane is on the ground, 30-year-old David J. Hanley becomes enraged by the hijacking while watching events unfold on television in the lounge of a Marriott hotel near the airport, drives his 1971 Cadillac through the airport's fence, and smashes it into the landing gear strut under the airliner's left wing at 80 mph (130 km/h) at 12:30 a.m. on June 24. McNally demands another Boeing 727, and after it arrives, he walks to it hiding behind hostages to avoid being shot by police snipers. He orders the new plane to take off and fly northeast. At 2:50 a.m. on June 24, he parachutes from the plane at an altitude of 8,000 feet (2,400 meters) near Peru, Indiana, with what ransom money he has left after giving the flight attendants generous tips, but loses the money and his gun during his descent. He later is apprehended by police.
- June 24 – Prinair Flight 191, a de Havilland DH.114 Heron 2B, crashes while attempting to land at Mercedita Airport in Ponce, Puerto Rico, killing five of the 20 people on board and injuring all 15 survivors.
- June 25 – Trans World Airlines inaugurates Lockheed L-1011 service with a flight from St. Louis, Missouri, to Los Angeles, California. The entire flight from takeoff to landing is made on autopilot.
- June 29
  - After a North Vietnamese surface-to-air missile cripples his OV-10 Bronco and renders his observer's parachute unusable, U.S. Air Force Captain Steven L. Bennett remains aboard the OV-10 and ditches it the Gulf of Tonkin in order to save his observer. Bennett dies, but the observer survives. Bennett will receive the Medal of Honor posthumously for his actions.
  - North Central Airlines Flight 290, a Convair CV-580 with five people on board, and Air Wisconsin Flight 671, a de Havilland Canada DHC-6 Twin Otter carrying eight people, collide over Wisconsin's Lake Winnebago. Both aircraft crash into the lake, killing all 13 people aboard.
- June 30
  - The American 1972 bombing campaign against North Vietnam has destroyed 106 bridges, all of the country's oil depots, and the pipeline running south to the Demilitarized Zone.
  - Due to his strange behavior while checking in for Hughes Airwest Flight 775, a Douglas DC-9, at Seattle–Tacoma International Airport outside Seattle, Washington, 25-year-old Daniel Bernard Carre is flagged as a possible aircraft hijacker and subjected to a thorough search, but found to be unarmed. He boards the plane, which takes off for a flight to Salt Lake City, Utah, with an intermediate stop at Portland, Oregon, with 42 people aboard. About halfway through the flight, he tells a stewardess that he wants $50,000 and a parachute, claiming he plans to jump out of the plane near Pocatello, Idaho. He does not mention having a weapon, so the captain continues the flight to Portland, where the captain orders the passengers to evacuate the airliner. Carre then surrenders quietly and is committed to a mental institution.

=== July ===
- The U.S. Navy EA-6B Prowler electronic warfare aircraft makes its combat debut, going into action over Vietnam from aircraft carriers.
- Yemen Arab Airlines (the future Yemenia) is nationalized and rebrands itself as Yemen Airways.
- July 2 – Over the South China Sea, as an act of revenge against the United States for revoking his travel visa and expelling him after he was arrested for occupying the South Vietnamese consulate in New York City in an anti-Vietnam War protest, a 24-year old South Vietnamese man, Nguyen Thai Binh, hijacks Pan American World Airways Flight 841, a Boeing 747 with 152 people on board flying from Manila in the Philippines to Saigon, South Vietnam, claiming he has a bomb. He demands to be flown to Hanoi, North Vietnam, after which he says he will destroy the airliner. The captain, Eugene Vaughn, refuses to comply, judges the "bomb" to be a fake, and quietly arranges for a retired San Francisco Police Department detective aboard as a passenger and armed with a .357 Magnum to shoot Binh. After the airliner lands at Tan Son Nhat International Airport under the pretext of refueling, Vaughn grabs Binh and throws him to the floor, and the detective shoots Binh five times, killing him. Vaughn then throws Binh's body out of the aircraft onto the tarmac. Binh's "bomb" turns out to be a package of lemons.
- July 5
  - After stabbing a woman and a man, a 23-year-old man takes a young girl hostage and flees to Greater Buffalo International Airport in Cheektowaga, New York, where he boards an empty Boeing 707 with his hostage. He demands to flown out of the Buffalo, New York, area, but surrenders after negotiations.
  - Armed with pistols, Michael Azmanoff and Dmitr Alexiev hijack Pacific Southwest Airlines Flight 710 – a Boeing 737-200 flying from San Francisco to Los Angeles, California, with 86 people on board – just after takeoff and demand US$800,000 in cash, two parachutes, navigational charts that will allow them to reach Siberia, and to be flown to the Soviet Union. The airliner returns to San Francisco International Airport, where the hijackers agree to allow a new pilot with international flight experience to board. As a U.S. Federal Bureau of Investigation (FBI) agent posing as the new pilot approaches the plane, the suspicious hijackers force him to strip down to his underwear while he still is on the tarmac. Meanwhile, a team of FBI agents armed with shotguns approaches by boat in a neighboring bay and sneak up on the plane, follow the agent posing as a pilot on board, and open fire, killing Alexiev instantly. A gun battle ensures in which Azmanoff and a passenger are killed. Two other passengers, one of them actor Victor Sen Yung, are wounded.
- July 6
  - An Aviaco Douglas DC-8-52 (registration EC-ARA) on a repositioning flight with no passengers aboard crashes into the Atlantic Ocean 21 kilometers (13 miles) east of Las Palmas in the Canary Islands, killing its entire crew of 10.
  - Absent without leave and armed with a pistol, United States Army helicopter crewman Francis Goodell hijacks Pacific Southwest Airlines Flight 389, a Boeing 727 flying from Oakland to Sacramento, California, with 58 people on board. He demands a parachute and US$450,000, which he claims he will give to "two organizations involved in the MIdeast crisis." The plane flies to San Diego, California, where Goodell picks up the ransom and releases all the passengers except for a California Highway Patrol officer who volunteers to remain aboard as a hostage. As the plane returns to Oakland, where Goodell has demanded that a helicopter pick him up, his hostage warns him that when he disembarks from the airliner, FBI snipers will shoot him to death. Frightened, Goodell surrenders.
- July 10 – A hijacker demanding money commandeers a Lufthansa Boeing 737 making a domestic flight in West Germany from Cologne to Munich.
- July 11 – With a fatigued and intoxicated pilot at its controls, a Royal Norwegian Air Force de Havilland Canada DHC-6 Twin Otter drifts off course in bad weather and crashes 15 kilometers (9.3 miles) north-northwest of Harstad, Norway, into 800-meter (2,600-foot) Lille Tussin Mountain on the island of Grytøya about 20 meters (66 feet) below its summit, killing all 17 people on board. At the time, it is the deadliest accident in history involving a Twin Otter.
- July 12
  - A hijacker seizes control of a UTA airliner flying from Abidjan, Ivory Coast, to Paris, France. Two people are killed during the hijacking.
  - Claiming to have a bomb and brandishing an empty .38-caliber revolver, Marvin Fisher hijacks American Airlines Flight 669 – a Boeing 727 carrying 57 people on a flight from Oklahoma City, Oklahoma, to Dallas, Texas – while it is flying over North Texas and forces it to return to Oklahoma City. After it lands at Will Rogers World Airport in Oklahoma City, he demands a ransom of $550,000 and parachutes. He receives $200,000, and releases the 50 passengers, then orders the plane to take off again with its seven crew members aboard as hostages. The airliner circles Oklahoma City for three hours before he gives his revolver to a stewardess and surrenders.
  - Armed with a sawed-off shotgun, a pistol, and a typewriter case they claim contains a bomb, Michael Stanley Green and Lulseged Tesfa hijack National Airlines Flight 496 – a Boeing 727 – as it flies from Philadelphia, Pennsylvania, to New York City with 113 people on board, demanding a ransom of US$600,000 and forcing the plane to return to Philadelphia, where they express a desire to flee to Mexico. During eight hours on the ground there, National Airlines gives them all the money it can raise – $500,000 plus $1,600 in Mexican pesos – and the pilot escapes, after which Green and Tesfa release the passengers and transfer to another Boeing 727 with sufficient range to take them to the United States Gulf Coast. The 727 takes off from Philadelphia and flies southwest with only the copilot, flight engineer, four female flight attendants, and the two hijackers aboard. It reaches Texas, passing over Dallas and then flying toward Houston. The hijackers decide that they want to go to Jamaica instead of Mexico, and by the time the plane is over the Gulf of Mexico it is desperately short of fuel, and it makes an emergency landing at Lake Jackson Dow Airport in Lake Jackson, Texas, blowing out two tires as the airliner brakes hard to avoid going off the end of the short runway. The copilot and flight engineer jump out of the plane, and, after four hours of negotiations during which the hijackers release one flight attendant and demand another plane while threatening to kill the three women still on board, the hijackers release them and surrender to the U.S. Federal Bureau of Investigation on July 13, 22 hours after the hijacking began.
- July 22 – American aircraft operating over Vietnam first note the slow-moving, black "Fat Black" surface-to-air missile.
- July 24 – British-born American entrepreneur, racing driver, and heir to the Woolworth fortune Lance Reventlow is killed along with the other three people aboard a Cessna U206 when it crashes in the Rocky Mountains near Aspen, Colorado, after its pilot flies into a blind canyon during a storm.
- July 26 – The National Aeronautics and Space Administration (NASA) announces Rockwell International as prime contractor for the Space Shuttle Orbiter.
- July 29 – Two Avianca Douglas DC-3A airliners – HK-1341, bound for Yopal, Colombia, with 17 people on board, and HK-107, bound for Paz de Ariporo, Colombia, with 21 people on board – depart Villavicencio Airport in Villavicencio, Colombia, two minutes apart. Flying in the same direction, they collide in mid-air over the Las Palomas mountains about 30 minutes after departure and crash, killing all 38 people on board the two aircraft.
- July 31 – George Wright and four other members of the Black Liberation Army accompanied by three children hijack Delta Air Lines Flight 841, a McDonnell Douglas DC-8 with 93 other people on board, during a flight from Detroit to Miami. After releasing the other 86 passengers at Miami International Airport and receiving a US$1,000,000 ransom, they force the plane to fly to Boston, and then on to Houari Boumediene Airport, in Algiers, Algeria, where Algerian authorities seize them on August 2. The unharmed seven-person crew then flies the plane back to the United States.

=== August ===
- The last element of the U.S. Army's 1st Cavalry Division (Airmobile), the 3rd Brigade (Reinforced), is withdrawn from Vietnam.
- August 1 – Delta Air Lines absorbs Northeast Airlines.
- August 11 – The North Atlantic Treaty Organization (NATO) signs a development contract for the MRCA (Multi-Role Combat Aircraft) programme, which will eventually result in the Panavia Tornado.
- August 12
  - Hit by small arms fire during its initial climb after takeoff from Sóc Trăng Airfield in South Vietnam, a United States Air Force C-130E Hercules crashes, killing 30 of the 44 people on board.
  - After coming in too low on his second attempt to make an instrument landing at Palam Airport in Delhi, India, the pilot of an Indian Airlines Fokker F27 Friendship 100 (registration VT-DME) attempts a go-around with the wrong flap settings and with the landing gear down. The airliner crashes 1.5 kilometers (0.9 miles) south of the airport, killing all 18 people on board.
- August 14 – An Interflug Ilyushin Il-62 on a charter flight crashes near Königs Wusterhausen in Brandenburg, East Germany, shortly after takeoff from Berlin-Schönefeld Airport in Schönefeld, East Germany, after a fire in the after portion of the plane causes the tail section to break off in flight. All 156 people on board die in the deadliest aviation accident of 1972 as well as the deadliest in the history of East Germany. It also remains the deadliest air disaster in the history of Germany as a whole.
- August 15
  - The U.S. Air Force completes Operation Saklolo, an airlift to Luzon for the relief of flood victims in the Philippines. Since the operation began on July 21, the Air Force has delivered 2,000 short tons (1,814 metric tons) of supplies and transported 1,500 passengers.
  - Four members of guerrilla groups supporting Peronist and leftist political groups in Argentina commandeer an Austral Líneas Aéreas BAC One-Eleven (registration LV-JNS) with 103 people on board at Trelew Airport in Trelew, Argentina, before it can take off for a domestic flight to Buenos Aires and force it to await the arrival of prisoners who have staged a mass escape from the penitentiary at Rawson, Argentina. Of the 110 who escape, six arrive and board the airliner, which then takes off for Santiago, Chile, leaving behind 19 more escapees who arrive at the airport just in time to see it take off. After a stop at Puerto Montt, Chile, the airliner flies on to Santiago, where the four hijackers and six escaped prisoners surrender and request political asylum in Chile.
- August 16
  - A Burma Airways Douglas C-47B-20-DK crashes into the Bay of Bengal during its initial climb out of Thandwe Airport in Thandwe, Burma, killing 28 of the 31 people on board and injuring all three survivors. It is the first fatal accident involving Burma Airways.
  - Two Royal Moroccan Air Force fighters attempt to shoot down the plane of King Hassan II of Morocco in a coup attempt by Minister of the Interior General Mohammed Oufkir. They miss, and the coup fails.
  - A bomb hidden in a record player given to two unsuspecting British passengers partially explodes in the luggage compartment of an El Al flight. The plane lands in Rome, Italy. The Popular Front for the Liberation of Palestine – General Command will be linked to the attack.
- August 18 – A hijacker demanding money commandeers United Airlines Flight 877, a Boeing 727 with 33 people on board flying from Reno, Nevada, to San Francisco, California. The airliner diverts to Seattle–Tacoma International Airport in Washington.
- August 22 – Three passengers claiming to be members of a group called the "Eagles of National Unity in South Yemen" hijack an Alyemda Douglas DC-6 during a flight from Cairo, Egypt, to Beirut, Lebanon. They force it to divert to Nicosia International Airport in Nicosia, Cyprus, where it makes a three-hour refueling stop. The airliner then proceeds to Benghazi, Libya, where the hijackers surrender to Libyan authorities.
- August 25 – Four hijackers commandeer an Aerolíneas TAO Vickers745D Viscount (registration HK-1058) during a domestic flight in Colombia from Neiva to Bogotá with 31 people on board, demanding to be flown to Cuba. After a refueling stop at Barrancabermeja, Colombia, the airliner proceeds to Camagüey, Cuba.
- August 27 – On approach to Canaima Airport in Canaima, Venezuela, while attempting to return to the airport after the failure of its No. 1 engine, a Linea Aeropostal Venezolana (LAV) Douglas C-47-DL Skytrain (registration YV-C-AKE) crashes, killing all 34 people on board.
- August 28
  - A Royal Australian Air Force de Havilland DHC-4A Caribou on a flight in the Territory of Papua New Guinea carrying army cadets from Lae Airfield to Port Moresby crashes in the Kudjero Gap, killing 25 of the 29 people on board.
  - Piloting an F-4 Phantom II with Captain Charles B. DeBellevue as his weapon systems officer, Captain Richard S. "Steve" Richie becomes the second American ace, and first U.S. Air Force ace, of the Vietnam War by shooting down his fifth MiG-21 (NATO reporting name "Fishbed").
  - Prince William of Gloucester is one of two people killed when the Piper Cherokee Arrow he is piloting during the Goodyear Trophy race crashes and explodes near Wolverhampton, England.
- August 31 – A fire breaks out in the baggage compartment of an Aeroflot Ilyushin Il-18V (registration CCCP-74298) at an altitude of 7,200 meters (23,600 feet) during a domestic flight in the Soviet Union from Alma-Ata to Moscow. Planning to make an emergency landing at Magnitogorsk, the crew begins an emergency descent, but is incapacitated at an altitude of 2,400 meters (7,900 feet). The airliner enters a spin and crashes in a field near Smelovskiy, killing all 101 people on board.

=== September ===
- North Vietnamese overland supply routes from the People's Republic of China come under American air attack in Operation Prime Choke.
- September 9 – A U.S. Air Force F-4D Phantom II crewed by Captain John A. Madden Jr., pilot, and Captain Charles B. DeBellevue, weapon systems officer, shoots down two MiG-19s (NATO reporting name "Farmer") over North Vietnam. They are Madden's first two kills and DeBelleuve's fifth and sixth. DeBellevue's six kills will make him the highest-scoring American ace of the Vietnam War.
- September 10 – The right wing of an Ethiopian Airlines Douglas C-47-DL Skytrain separates from the aircraft during a domestic flight in Ethiopia from Axum to Gondar. The airliner crashes near Gondar, killing all 11 people on board.
- September 11
  - The new North Vietnamese "Fat Black" surface-to-air missile makes its first kill, shooting down a U.S. Marine Corps F-4J Phantom II fighter.
  - Flying a U.S. Marine Corps F-4 Phantom II fighter, Major Lee T Lasseter, USMC (pilot) and Captain John D. Cummings (radar intercept officer) of Marine Fighter Squadron 333 (VMF-333) operating from the aircraft carrier USS America shoot down a North Vietnamese MiG-21 fighter near Haiphong. It is the only U.S. Marine Corps air-to-air victory of the Vietnam War.
  - American aircraft use precision-guided munitions to destroy the Long Bien Bridge over the Red River in downtown Hanoi.
- September 13 – A Royal Nepalese Army Air Service Douglas C-47A-DL-45 Skytrain carrying paratroopers on a training flight strikes high-tension lines near a highway and crashes at Panchkha, Nepal, killing all 31 people on board.
- September 15 – Just after a Scandinavian Airlines System Douglas DC-9-32 (registration LN-RLO) with 90 people on board takes off from Goteborg, Sweden, for a domestic flight to Stockholm, three men belonging to the Croatian Ustasja Movement hijack it and force it to divert to Bulltofta Airport outside Malmö, Sweden. They demand 500,000 Swedish krona in cash and the release of seven Croatians imprisoned in Sweden since 1971 for committing terrorist acts. During the evening of September 15, the hijackers permit six passengers to leave the plane for medical reasons. During the predawn hours of September 16, authorities bring the seven Croatian prisoners to the airport; one of them refuses to join the hijackers, but the other six board the airliner and the hijackers release 30 passengers in exchange. A few hours later, a police car delivers the ransom money to the hijackers, and they release the rest of the passengers and force the plane to fly to Madrid, Spain, carrying its crew of four and the nine Croatians. The Croatians request political asylum in Spain, but Spanish authorities arrest them.
- September 22 – The 1,000th Boeing 727 is sold, a sales record for airliners.
- September 24
  - An Air Vietnam Douglas C-54D-1-DC Skymaster flying from Vientiane, Laos, to Saigon, South Vietnam, crashes into a marsh near Bến Cát, South Vietnam, killing 10 of the 13 people on board.
  - Thinking they are landing at Santacruz Airport near Bombay, India, the pilots of a Douglas DC-8-53 operating as Japan Airlines Flight 472 mistakenly land at nearby Juhu Aerodrome on a runway that is too short for a DC-8. The plane overruns the runway and is written off; there are no fatalities, but 11 of the 122 people on board were injured.
  - At the Golden West Sport Aviation Show in Sacramento California, a privately owned F-86 Sabre malfunctions while on taking off to leave the show, failing to become airborne. It goes through a chain link fence at the end of the runway, crushes a parked car, and crashes into a Farrell's Ice Cream Parlor. The crash kills 10 adults and 12 children, including two people in the parked car.
- September 28 – Air Florida begins flight operations, employing a fleet of two Boeing 707s and offering thrice-daily service in Florida from Miami to Orlando to St. Petersburg.

=== October ===
- October 1
  - Aeroflot Flight 1036, an Ilyushin Il-18V (registration CCCP-75507) bound for Moscow, crashes into the Black Sea 4 kilometers (2.5 miles) off shore during its initial climb from Sochi Airport in Sochi in the Soviet Union's Russian Soviet Federated Socialist Republic and sinks to a depth of 600 meters (2,000 feet) in an underwater canyon. The crash kills all 109 people on board. At the time, it is the second-worst accident involving an Il-18 and the deadliest aviation accident in the history of the Russian Soviet Federated Socialist Republic, although it will hold the latter record for only 12 days.
  - Singapore Airlines commenced operation.
- October 6 – A hijacker demands money aboard Aero Trasporti Italiani Flight 373, a Fokker F27 Friendship bound from Trieste to Bari, Italy. A policeman shoots and kills the hijacker at Trieste.
- October 10 – A competitive fly-off between the Northrop YA-9 and Fairchild YA-10 begins, continuing until December 9.
- October 11 – A hijacker demanding money commandeers a Lufthansa Boeing 727 flying from Lisbon, Portugal, to Frankfurt-am-Main, West Germany. The hijacker is shot and captured while trying to move from the airliner to a car at Frankfurt-am-Main.
- October 13
  - A United States Air Force F-4D Phantom II crewed by Lieutenant Colonel Curtis D. Westphal, pilot, and Captain Jeffrey S. Feinstein, weapon systems officer, shoots down a MiG-21 (NATO reporting name "Fishbed") over North Vietnam. The kill gives Feinstein his fifth aerial victory; he is the last of five American aviators – three Air Force and two Navy – to achieve ace status during the Vietnam War.
  - Aeroflot Flight 217, an Ilyushin Il-62 (registration CCCP-86671), crashes in a forest 11 kilometers (6.8 miles) north of Moscow's Sheremetyevo Airport while on approach for a landing there. The crash kills all 174 people on board. It is the second-worst accident involving an Il-62 and it replaces an Ilyushin Il-18V crash 12 days earlier as the deadliest aviation accident in the history of the Russian Soviet Federated Socialist Republic at the time.
  - Carrying the Old Christians Club rugby union team from Montevideo, Uruguay, to play a match in Santiago, Chile, a Uruguayan Air Force Fairchild FH-227 operating as Flight 571 with 45 people on board, crashes in the Andes in Argentina at an altitude of 3,600 m (11,800 ft). Twelve of those aboard die in the crash, five the next morning, and one more after eight days. An avalanche sweeps over the wreckage on October 29, killing eight more people, and another three die in November and December; survivors resort to eating dead passengers to stay alive. On December 12, passengers Nando Parrado and Roberto Canessa make a 10-day hike to find help, reaching safety on December 22 and finally informing authorities of the survivors. The other 14 survivors finally are rescued on December 22 and 23.
- October 16 – A Cessna 310C carrying U.S. House Majority Leader Hale Boggs and U.S. Congressman Nick Begich of Alaska disappears while approaching Alaska's Chugach Mountains during a flight from Anchorage to Juneau with the loss of all four people on board. An intensive 39-day search and rescue effort by aircraft of the United States Coast Guard, United States Navy, and U.S. Air Force is called off on November 24, and no wreckage or bodies are ever found.
- October 21 – Olympic Airways Flight 506, a NAMC YS-11A-500 (registration SX-BBQ) crashes into the Aegean Sea 3 kilometers (1.9 miles) short of the airport while on approach to land at Ellinikon International Airport in Athens, Greece, in reduced visibility. The crash kills 37 of the 53 people on board.
- October 22 – Four hijackers take control of Turkish Airlines Flight 102 – Boeing 707-321 with 76 people on board making a domestic flight in Turkey from Istanbul to Ankara – and demand the release of prisoners. They force the airliner to fly to Sofia, Bulgaria, where they surrender.
- October 23
  - In Vietnam, Operation Linebacker concludes.
  - A Soviet Air Force Antonov An-12BP (NATO reporting name "Cub") transporting military personnel with 20 people on board collides in poor visibility while on approach to Tula in the Soviet Union's Russian Soviet Federated Socialist Republic with another Soviet Air Force An-12BP on a training flight with seven people on board. Both aircraft crash, killing everyone on board both planes. The air surveillance radar at Tula is out of service at the time of the collision.
- October 24 – As a peace gesture, the United States begins a seven-day halt on the bombing of North Vietnamese targets north of the 20th Parallel, but continues airstrikes at near-record levels against North Vietnamese supply lines south of the line.
- October 26 – The Russian American aviation pioneer Igor Sikorsky dies at the age of 83.
- October 27 – The crew of Air Inter Flight 696, a Vickers 724 Viscount (registration F-BMCH), begins their descent to Clermont-Ferrand Auvergne Airport in Clermont-Ferrand, France, too early. The airliner crashes into the mountain Pic du Picon near Noirétable, France, at an altitude of 1,000 feet (300 meters), killing 60 of the 68 people on board.
- October 29
  - Two Palestinians hijack Lufthansa Flight 615 and demand the release of the three Black September members jailed in West Germany for the September 1972 attack on the Israeli Olympic team. After circling Zagreb, Yugoslavia before landing to pick up the three Black September members, they order the airliner to fly to Tripoli, Libya, where they are welcomed as heroes and the hostages are released 16 hours after the hijacking began.
  - Four days after killing an Arlington County, Virginia, police officer and a bank manager during a bank robbery, Charles A. Tuller, his teenage sons Bryce and Jonathan, and teenager William White Graham kill an Eastern Airlines ticket agent in Houston, hijack Eastern Airlines Flight 486 – a Boeing 727 with 13 passengers and a crew of seven aboard – there, and order it to be flown to Havana, Cuba. During the four-hour flight, which includes a refueling stop at New Orleans, Charles Tuller repeatedly harangues the 13 passengers aboard during the flight, saying he is a "white middle-class revolutionary" and that Cuba is "the only place that a person could enjoy the benefits of freedom", and threatening some of them with guns. The three Tullers will return to the United States in June 1975, calling life in Cuba "a living hell", and be arrested. Graham will return in the late 1970s and be arrested in 1993.
- October 30 – Aero Trasporti Italiani Flight 327, a Fokker F27 Friendship 200 (registration I-ATIR), strikes a hillside near Poggiorsini, Italy, at an altitude of 442 meters (1,450 feet) while descending to land at Bari and crashes, killing all 27 people on board.
- October 31 – Two pilots are killed in the crash of a Dassault Falcon 10 prototype.

=== November ===
- November 4 – During a domestic flight in Bulgaria from Bourgas to Sofia, a Balkan Bulgarian Airlines Ilyushin Il-14P's (registration LZ-ILA) pilot decides to divert to Plovdiv due to poor visibility at Sofia. An air traffic controller at Plovdiv gives the Il-14P descent instructions without knowing its exact position; following the instructions in poor visibility, the airliner crashes into the side of a hill near Cruncha, killing all 35 people on board.
- November 6 – Armed with a .38-caliber revolver and claiming to have two bombs, 47-year-old Tatsuji Nakaoka, wearing a mask and traveling under the pseudonym "Kozo Hotta," hijacks a Japan Air Lines Boeing 727 with 126 people on board shortly after it takes off from Tokyo's Haneda Airport for a domestic flight to Fukuoka, Japan. He forces the airliner to return to Haneda Airport, and demands $2 million in U.S. currency and that a Douglas DC-8 be provided to fly him to Cuba, stipulating that the DC-8 stop at Vancouver and in Mexico along the way. After receiving the ransom money, Nakaoka takes eight hostages and boards the DC-8, where several police officers hiding in the main cabin immediately overpower and arrest him.
- November 8 – Four hijackers commandeer a Mexicana de Aviación Boeing 727-200 with 111 people on board making a domestic flight in Mexico from Monterrey to Mexico City and demand a ransom and the release of political prisoners. After six prisoners board the airliner and the ransom is delivered, the hijackers force the plane to fly to Havana, Cuba.
- November 10–12 – Seeking revenge against the City of Detroit, Michigan, for alleged police brutality and an arrest for sexual assault, Louis Moore and Henry Jackson join with Melvin Cale in hijacking Southern Airways Flight 49, a Douglas DC-9 with 33 people aboard, during a flight from Birmingham to Montgomery, Alabama. Armed with guns and hand grenades, they demand 10 parachutes, 10 bulletproof vests, and a US$10 million ransom, and order the airliner to fly to Detroit to pick it up. Fog prevents a landing there, and the plane diverts to Cleveland, Ohio, while the hijackers consume the plane's liquor supply. They then order the plane to fly on to Toronto, Ontario, Canada, where Southern Airways offers them US$500,000. Moore rejects this and orders the plane to take off again and fly to Knoxville, Tennessee, but before arrival there orders the plane to circle the Oak Ridge National Laboratory, threatening to crash the plane into the nuclear reactor there unless his demands are not met. Southern Airways collects 150 pounds (68 kg) of cash totaling $2 million, and gives it to the hijackers when the airliner lands at Chattanooga, Tennessee, hoping the hijackers will be too impressed by the physical amount of cash to realize it is less than they demanded. The ruse works, and the jubilant hijackers hand out cash to the passengers and crew, but then order the plane to fly to Havana, Cuba, where authorities refuse to allow the hijackers to disembark. The airliner takes off again, stops at Key West, Florida, and then lands at a United States Air Force base near Orlando, Florida, where Federal Bureau of Investigation agents damage its landing gear with gunfire. It again flies to Havana, arriving there on November 12, and Cuban authorities arrest and jail the hijackers and impound the ransom for return to Southern Airways. The hijacking prompts a change of heart among airlines and transportation authorities in the United States, who previously had viewed hijacking as a relatively benign interference in their business that rarely resulted in harm to anyone and not worth the inconvenience and expense of preventing it, and leads to the requirement to screen all passengers boarding airliners in the United States beginning in January 1973.
- November 15 – The first attempted aircraft hijacking in Australia takes place when Miloslav Hrabinec attempts to hijack Ansett Airlines Flight 232, a Fokker F27 Friendship with 31 other people on board, as it is descending to land at Alice Springs. He demands a parachute and to be flown 1,000 miles (1,600 km) into the desert. After landing at Alice Springs, he releases 22 passengers, then threatens to begin shooting the rest of the people on board if not given a light plane, a pilot, and a parachute. After he leaves the Fokker to approach the light plane with a flight attendant as a hostage, he wounds a policeman, is brought under fire by police, and then shoots himself to death.
- November 22 – While U.S. Air Force B-52 Stratofortresses fly their heaviest raids of the Vietnam War at the time during the day, a North Vietnamese surface-to-air missile hits a B-52 over North Vietnam near Vinh; its crew manages to fly it to Thailand before ejecting. It is the first time in history that a B-52 has been lost to enemy action.
- November 24 – A hijacker seizes control of an Air Canada Douglas DC-8 bound from Frankfurt-am-Main, West Germany, to Montreal, Quebec, Canada, and demands the release of political prisoners. Police storm the airliner at Frankfurt Airport and arrest the hijacker. One person is killed during the hijacking.
- November 28
  - Philippine Airlines Flight 463, a Hawker Siddeley HS 748-232 Series 2, veers off the runway and suffers severe wing and propeller damage and a nose wheel collapse on landing at Bislig Airport in Bislig, Philippines. All 28 people on board survive.
  - Japan Airlines Flight 446, a Douglas DC-8-62, stalls and crashes during climbout from Sheremetyevo International Airport in Moscow, killing 62 of the 76 people on board and injuring all 14 survivors.

=== December ===
- Union of Burma Airways is renamed Burma Airways. It eventually will become Myanmar National Airlines.
- President of Cuba Fidel Castro allows the "Freedom Flights" program – which since December 1965 has carried Cubans wishing to leave Cuba to the United States, using flights by commercial aircraft that depart Cuba twice a day, five days a week – to resume. He had suspended the flights in May.
- December 3 – Spantax Flight 275, a chartered Convair 990 Coronado (registration EC-BZR) bound for Munich, West Germany, crashes in near-zero visibility on takeoff from Tenerife-Norte Los Rodeos Airport on Tenerife in Spain's Canary islands, killing all 155 people on board. It is the deadliest accident involving a Convair 990 and at the time is the deadliest aviation accident on Spanish soil in history.
- December 5 – The United States Department of Transportation announces that mandatory security screening of all airline passengers will begin at all airports in the United States on January 5, 1973. Since the epidemic of U.S. aircraft hijackings began in 1961, 159 hijackings have taken place in the United States, most of them with Cuba as the destination.
- December 8
  - Seven members of the Eritrean Liberation Front attempt to hijack Ethiopian Airlines Flight 708, a Boeing 720-060B with 87 other people on board, minutes after it departs Haile Selassie I International Airport in Addis Ababa, Ethiopia. Security guards on board open fire, killing six of them and mortally wounding the seventh. There are no other fatalities. The seventh hijacker later dies at a hospital.
  - United Air Lines Flight 553, a Boeing 737-222, crashes on approach to Chicago Midway International Airport in Chicago. Forty-three people on the plane die, as do two people on the ground; 16 aboard the plane survive. Among the dead are Illinois Congressman George W. Collins; Dorothy Hunt, the wife of Watergate conspirator E. Howard Hunt; Michele Clark, a correspondent for CBS News and one of the first African American network correspondents; and Alex E. Krill, a noted ophthalmologist from the University of Chicago. It is the first fatal accident involving a Boeing 737.
  - A Fokker F-27 Friendship 600 of Pakistan International Airlines crashes as Flight 631 killing everyone on board.
- December 14 – Twenty-one-year-old Larry Stanford pulls a .22-caliber rifle out of his coat while boarding Quebecair Flight 321 – a BAC One-Eleven scheduled to make a domestic flight in Canada from Wabush, Newfoundland, to Montreal, Quebec, with a scheduled stop at Quebec City, Quebec – and brandishes it at passengers. After 20 minutes, he orders the pilot to take off and fly directly to Montreal without stopping at Quebec City. At Montreal, he releases all 52 passengers and a stewardess, then demands that the plane fly to Ottawa, Ontario, Canada. After 15 minutes on the ground at Ottawa, he orders it to fly back to Montreal, where he meets with his father and a psychiatrist aboard the plane, then surrenders peacefully.
- December 18–25 – Frustrated with a lack of progress in peace talks with North Vietnamese negotiators, the United States conducts Operation Linebacker II. Sometimes called "The December Raids" and "The Christmas Bombing", it involves intense American bombing of North Vietnam, including heavy operations by U.S. Air Force B-52 Stratofortresses and the laying of naval mines in North Vietnamese harbors including Haiphong. On the first day, 86 B-52s based at Guam strike Hanoi.
- December 18 – During a mission to bomb targets near Hanoi on the first day of Operation Linebacker II, the tail gunner on a Thailand-based U.S. Air Force B-52D Stratofortress, Staff Sergeant Samuel O. Turner, shoots down a MiG-21 (NATO reporting name FISHBED) fighter. It is the first aerial kill by a B-52 gunner, the first by any turret gunner since the Korean War (1950–1953), and the first of only two such kills during the Vietnam War. The second and last one will occur only six days later.
- December 20 – North Central Airlines Flight 575, a McDonnell Douglas DC-9-31, collides with Delta Air Lines Flight 954, a Convair CV-880, on a runway at O'Hare International Airport in Chicago, killing 10 and injuring 15 of the 45 people on board the DC-9 and injuring two of the 93 people aboard the CV-880.
- December 21 – An Air Guadeloupe de Havilland Canada DHC-6 Twin Otter 300 (registration F-OGFE) flying a flight for Air France from Pointe-à-Pitre, Guadeloupe, to Sint Maarten in the Netherlands Antilles, crashes into the Caribbean Sea off Sint Maarten during a night approach to Princess Juliana International Airport, killing all 13 people on board.
- December 23
  - Soviet aircraft designer Andrei Tupolev dies, aged 86.
  - Braathens SAFE Flight 239, a Fokker F28 Fellowship, crashes at Asker, Norway, while on approach to land at Oslo Airport in Fornebu, killing 40 of the 45 people on board and injuring all five survivors. It is the deadliest air accident in Norwegian history at the time and the first involving a Fokker Fellowship.
- December 24 – During a mission to bomb North Vietnamese rail yards at Thái Nguyên during Operation Linebacker II, the tail gunner on the Thailand-based U.S. Air Force B-52D Stratofortress Diamond Lil, Airman First Class Albert E. Moore, shoots down a North Vietnamese MiG-21 (NATO reporting name FISHBED) fighter. It is only the second aerial kill by a B-52 gunner, the second by any turret gunner since the Korean War (1950–1953), and the last of only two such kills during the Vietnam War; the first had occurred only six days earlier. It is the last time in history that a bomber gunner scores an aerial victory.
- December 25 – The United States begins a 36-hour pause in the bombing of North Vietnam.
- December 26 – Operation Linebacker II resumes with 117 B-52 Stratofortresses attacking Hanoi in the largest air attack of the Vietnam War to this time.
- December 27 – The U.S. Marine Corps loses a fixed-wing aircraft over Vietnam for the last time.
- December 29
  - Operation Linebacker II concludes. During the operation, U.S. Air Force B-52 Stratofortresses have flown 729 sorties and dropped 15,000 short tons (13,400 long tons; 13,600 tonnes) of bombs on 34 targets, and B-52 gunners have claimed five enemy aircraft shot down, of which two are confirmed. Fifteen B-52s have been shot down, all by North Vietnamese surface-to-air missiles.
  - Eastern Air Lines Flight 401, a Lockheed L-1011 Tristar, crashes into the Florida Everglades after the pilots are distracted by a faulty lightbulb; 101 people die and the other 75 on board are injured.
- December 30 – President Richard Nixon orders a halt to the bombing of North Vietnam as the North Vietnamese show a renewed interest in peace negotiations.
- December 31 – Puerto Rican Major League Baseball star Roberto Clemente and all four other people aboard a Douglas DC-7CF die when the plane crashes into the Atlantic Ocean off Isla Verde just after takeoff from San Juan, Puerto Rico. He had chartered the plane to carry aid to Nicaragua after a major earthquake there.

== First flights ==
=== January ===
- January 10 — Kaman KSA-100 SAVER
- January 11 — EAA Acro Sport I
- January 21 - Lockheed S-3A Viking 157992

=== February ===
- February 9 — Halton Jupiter
- February 21 - AESL Airtrainer ZK-DGY

=== March ===
- March 23 — PIK-19
- March 30 — HAL Basant II

=== May ===
- May 10 - Fairchild YA-10 71-1369
- May 27 - Partenavia P.70 Alpha I-GIOY
- May 30 - Northrop YA-9 71-1367

=== June ===
- June 2 - Aérospatiale SA 360 Dauphin F-WSQL

=== July ===
- July 6 – SAAB-MFI 17
- July 12 — Pazmany PL-4
- July 22 — Akaflieg Braunschweig SB-10 Schirokko
- July 27 – McDonnell Douglas YF-15A 71-280, first pre-production F-15 Eagle

=== August ===
- August 11 — Northrop F-5E

=== September ===
- September 18 – Dornier Aerodyne

=== October ===
- October 27 – Beechcraft Super King Air Model 200
- October 28 – Airbus A300

=== November ===
- November 4 – Schretzmann S.W.1 Pegasus
- November 25 — Manuel Hawk
- November 30 — CSIR Sara II

=== December ===
- December 19 — Akaflieg Darmstadt D-38
- December 20 — Akaflieg Stuttgart fs28
- December 23 - Aero Boero 260AG
- December 23 — HPA Toucan
- December 23 — SZD-40x Halny

== Entered service ==
- Fairchild Swearingen Metroliner with Societe Miniere de Bakwanga
- Summer 1972 – Beechcraft King Air Model E90

=== April ===
- April 15 – Lockheed L-1011 TriStar with Eastern Air Lines

=== October ===
- October 8 – Grumman F-14A Tomcat, the United States Navy's first carrier-based variable-geometry wing aircraft, with U.S. Navy Fighter Squadron 124 (VF-124)

== Retirements ==
=== August ===
- August 27 – Antonov An-10 by Aeroflot (25 An-10A aircraft transferred to the Soviet Air Force and Soviet Ministry of Aircraft Production elements remain in service until 1974)

=== November ===
- November 30 – Dornier Aerodyne

== Accidents and incidents ==
1972 remains the deadliest year in aviation history since World War II, with many accidents and incidents involving over 50 fatalities; 2,313 people were killed in aviation crashes in this year. The deadliest crash of this year was Aeroflot Flight 217, a Ilyushin Il-62 which crashed while on approach to Sheremetyevo Airport in Moscow, Russian SFSR on 13 October, killing all 174 people on board. In addition, many accidents and incidents involving under 50 fatalities were recorded.
