= VMFA-333 =

Marine Fighter Attack Squadron 333
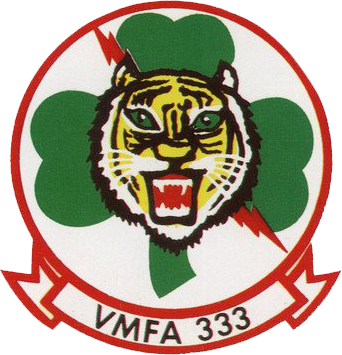
- VMFA-333 Insignia
- Active: 1 August 1943 – 1 November 1945; 1 August 1952 – 31 March 1992
- Country: United States of America
- Branch: United States Marine Corps
- Type: Attack
- Role: Close air support Air interdiction Aerial reconnaissance
- Part of: Deactivated
- Nicknames: "Fighting Shamrocks" "Trip Trey"
- Tail Code: WN, later DN
- Engagements: World War II; Vietnam War; Operation Desert Storm

Aircraft flown
- Attack: AD-1 Skyraider
- Bomber: SBD Dauntless
- Fighter: F4U Corsair; F6F Hellcat; FJ Fury; F-8 Crusader; F-4 Phantom II; F/A-18 Hornet

Marine Fighter Attack Squadron 333 (VMFA-333) was a United States Marine Corps fighter squadron consisting of F/A-18 Hornets. Known as the "Fighting Shamrocks" and "Trip Trey", the squadron participated in action during World War II, the Vietnam War and Operation Desert Storm The squadron’s aircraft were easily recognizable by the row of three shamrocks painted on the vertical stabilizers of their aircraft. They were decommissioned on 31 March 1992.

== History ==
=== World War II ===
Marine Scout Bombing Squadron 333 (VMSB-333) was commissioned on 1 August 1943, at Marine Corps Air Station Cherry Point, North Carolina. In April 1944, a portion of the squadron was sent to Naval Air Station Key West, Florida for anti-submarine training and upon their return departed for San Diego. Three weeks after that, the squadron left for Hawaii. In July 1944, the squadron was transferred to Midway Island and began flying anti-submarine patrols in their SBD Dauntless bombers. The squadron was redesignated Marine Fighter Bomber Squadron 333 (VMBF-333) on 14 October 1944, and transitioned to the F4U Corsair.

The squadron reverted to VMSB-333 on 20 December 1944 and was transferred back to Marine Corps Air Station Ewa, Hawaii for the remainder of the war. VMSB-333 was deactivated on 1 November 1945.

=== 1950s ===
They were reactivated on 1 August 1952, as Marine Attack Squadron 333 (VMA-333) and located at Marine Corps Air Station Miami and equipped with the Grumman F6F Hellcat. The Hellcats were quickly replaced with Corsairs and they were in turn replaced with A-1 Skyraiders. The Squadron was redesignated Marine Fighter Squadron 333 (VMF-333) on 28 January 1957, and again transitioned airframes, this time to the FJ3 Fury. In March 1958 the squadron deployed aboard the USS Forrestal to take part in training exercises in the Caribbean. On 21 May 1958, the squadron relocated to Marine Corps Air Station Beaufort, South Carolina.

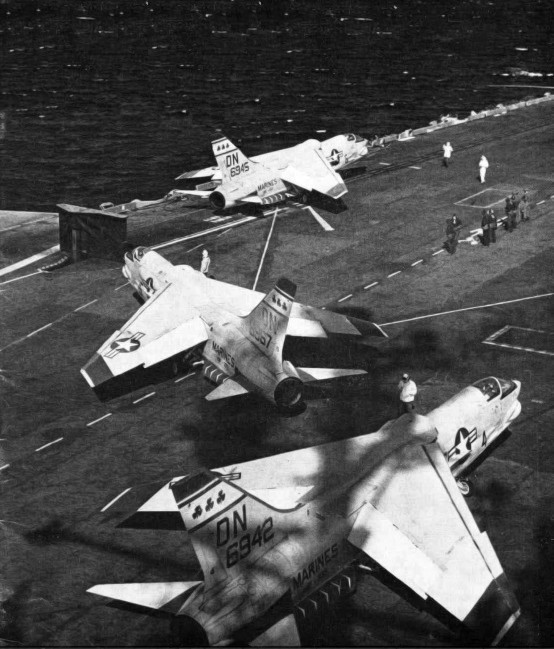
Three F-8Cs of VMF-333 on the USS Forrestal, 1960.

Three years later VMF-333 became the first Marine Corps squadron to receive the F-8 Crusader. On 14 August 1962, the squadron performed a non-stop air refuelled deployment to Naval Station Roosevelt Roads, Puerto Rico and Naval Station Guantanamo Bay, Cuba. Of the 22 aircraft in the squadron 4 were initially stationed at Gitmo as armed Hot Pad Alert aircraft. The rest of the reinforced squadron (parts of Marine Air Base Squadron 32 and Headquarters and Maintenance Squadron 32 were attached) at Roosevelt Roads engaged in advanced tactics, gunnery and missile training while living in a tent city that served as a deployment test site. The squadron was already in position when the Cuban Missile Crisis erupted in October 1962 and the aircraft numbers at Gitmo were reinforced should the need have arisen to strike targets in Cuba. During the crisis, VMF-333 was joined by Marine Attack Squadron 331 and assumed tactical command over the Puerto Rico Air National Guard's F-86 aircraft as a combined Puerto Rico Air Defense Command. Trip Tree returned to MCAS Beaufort in December of that year after the crisis was resolved.

=== Vietnam War ===
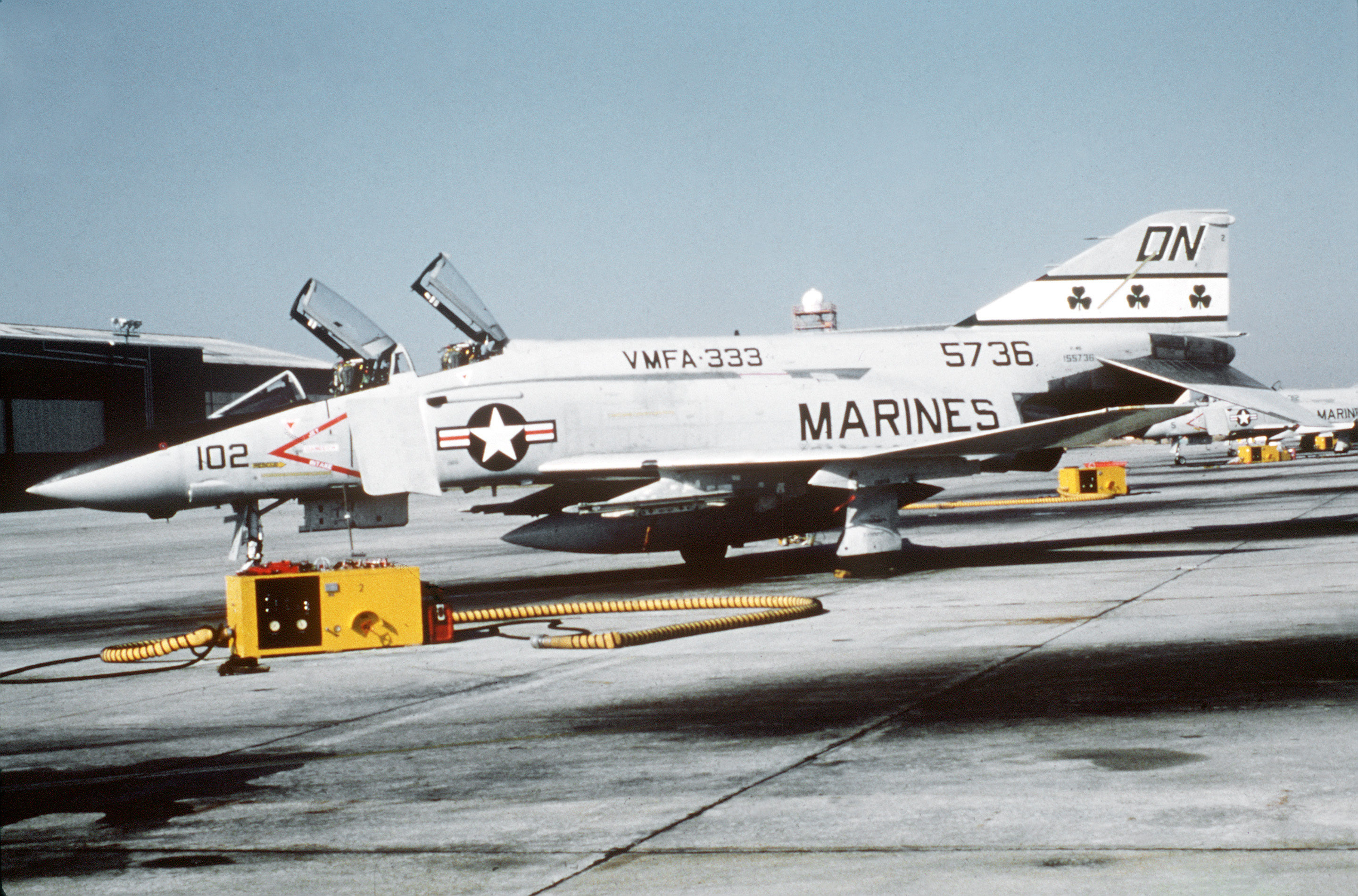
A VMFA-333 F-4S at MCAS Cherry Point in 1979.

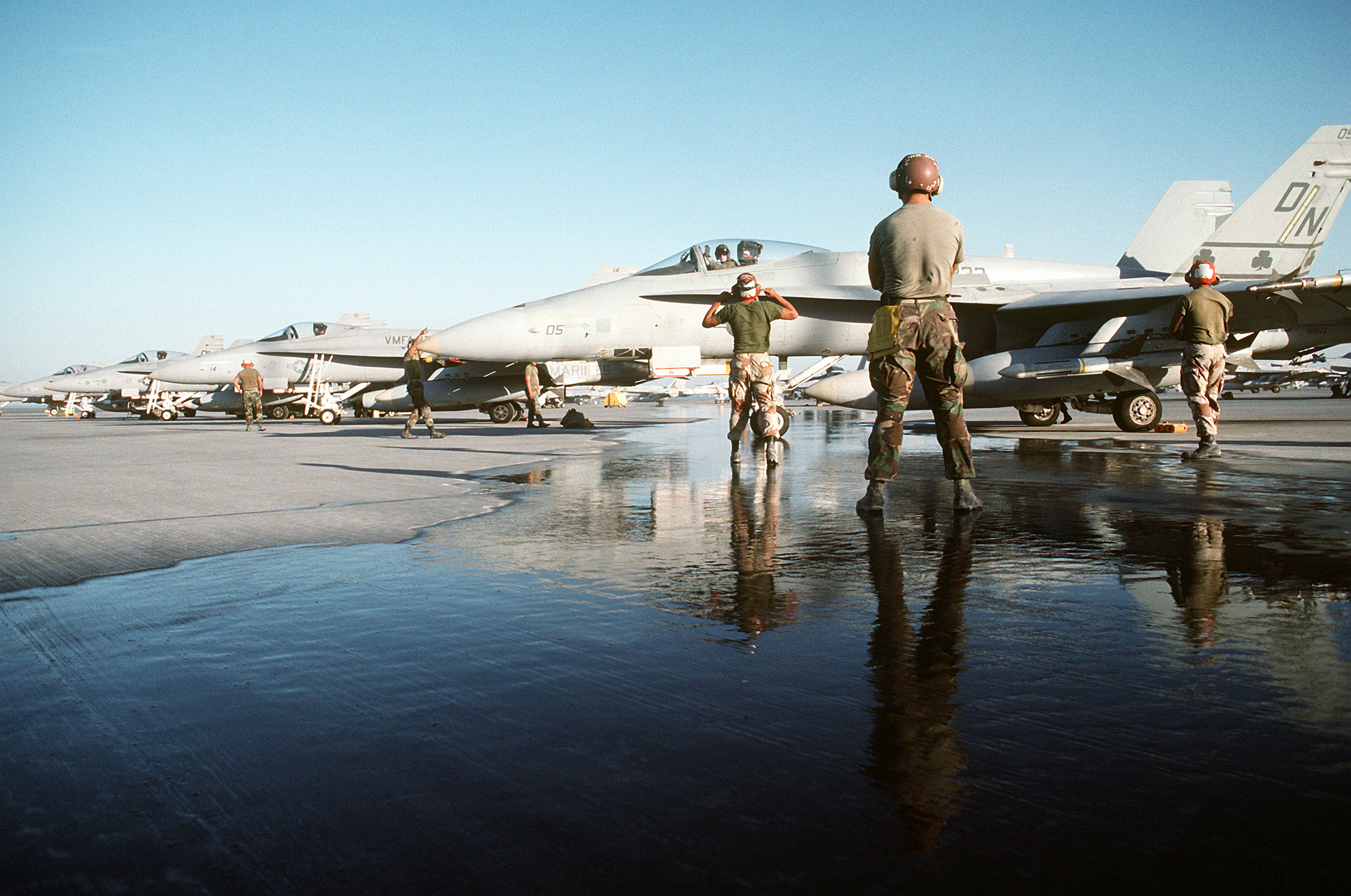
Hornets from VMFA-333 during Operation Desert Shield, 1992.

On 1 February 1966, The squadron was again redesignated as Marine All Weather Fighter Squadron 333 (VMF(AW)-333) when they received new all-weather versions of the F-8 Crusader. The squadrons last name change came on 20 June 1966 when they became Marine Fighter Attack Squadron 333 (VMFA-333) as they transitioned to the F-4 Phantom II. On 5 June 1972, VMFA-333 departed Naval Air Station Oceana for a six month deployment on board the USS America (CVA-66). The America arrived at Yankee Station off the coast of South Vietnam on 13 July 1972 and VMFA-333 began flying combat sorties the next day. It was during this deployment that the squadron got its only air-to-air kill when Major Lee T Lasseter, USMC along with his RIO, Capt. John D. Cummings shot down a MiG-21 over North Vietnam, near Hanoi. After the shoot down both aircraft were damaged by flak and an SA-2 SAM, which hit 5526 in the tail section. Close to running out of fuel and with 5526 on fire from the SAM hit, the pilots ejected just south of Haiphong Harbor. The incident was also the first and only all-Marine kill during the Vietnam War. Two other Marines shot down MiGs but they were on exchange with the Air Force. Until 1978 the squadron remained affiliated with Carrier Air Wing 8 and made a 1976 deployment aboard the USS Nimitz (CVN-68). Major Lee T. Lasseter later assumed command of VMFA-333 and was named Marine Aviator of the year for 1972.

=== 1980s and 1990s ===
VMFA-333 was the last regular Marine squadron to operate the F-4 Phantom, and finally transferred to the F/A-18 Hornet in October 1987. During their final deployment to the Persian Gulf in 1990-1991 as part of Operation Desert Storm, the Shamrocks flew more than seven hundred combat missions without loss and delivered more than two million pounds of ordnance against Iraqi forces. VMFA-333 was deactivated effective 31 March 1992.

== See also ==
- United States Marine Corps Aviation
- List of decommissioned United States Marine Corps aircraft squadrons
