= HAL HA-31 Basant =

Agricultural aircraft family by Hindustan Aeronautics Ltd

HA-31 Basant
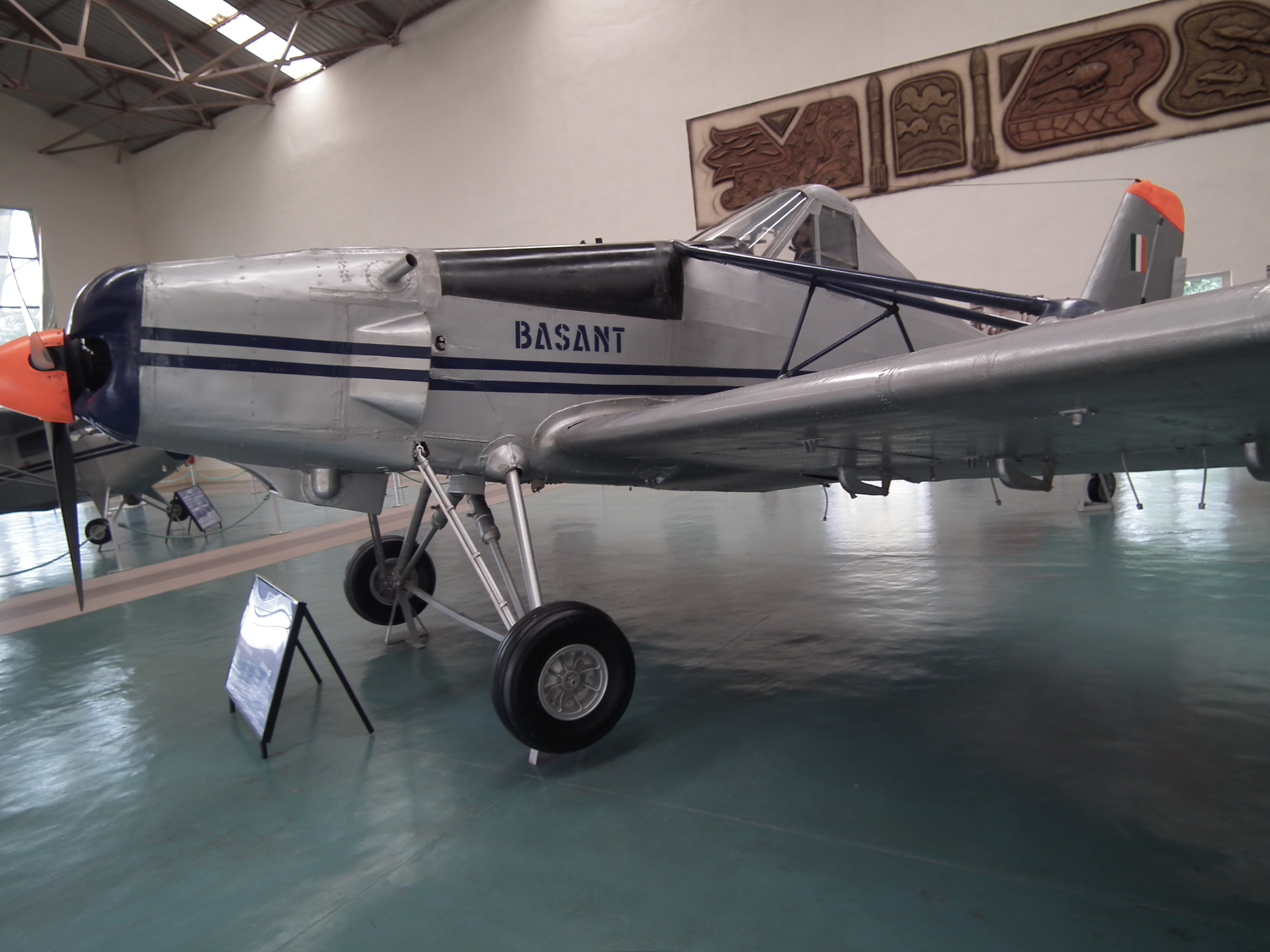

General information
- Type: Agricultural/utility aircraft
- Manufacturer: Hindustan Aeronautics
- Number built: 39

History
- Manufactured: 1972-1980
- First flight: 1972 (Mark II)

The Hindustan Aeronautics HA-31 Basant (lit. 'Spring') is a 1970s Indian agricultural monoplane built by Hindustan Aeronautics.

Hindustan Aeronautics started to design an agricultural aircraft in 1968 designated the HAL-31 Mk 1 with a cockpit directly over the wing leading edge. It was re-designed as the HA-31 Mk II Basant and first flew on 30 March 1972. The Basant is a conventional braced low-wing monoplane with a fixed tailwheel landing gear and powered by a 400 hp (298 kW) Avco Lycoming IO-720 piston engine. It had a raised cockpit to give the pilot a good all-round view during spraying operations. Production ended in 1980 after 39 aircraft had been built.

== Specifications (Mk II) ==
Data from The Illustrated Encyclopedia of Aircraft (Part Work 1982–1985), 1985, Orbis Publishing, Page 2160

General characteristics

- Crew: One
- Length: 29 ft 6.25 in (9.0 m)
- Wingspan: 39 ft 4.5 in (12 m)
- Height: 8 ft 4.5 in (2.55 m)
- Wing area: 251.23 sq ft (23.34 m^{2})
- Empty weight: 2,645 lb (1,200 kg)
- Gross weight: 5,000 lb (2,270 kg)
- Powerplant: 1 × Avco Lycoming IO-720-C1B flat-eight piston engine , 400 hp (298 kW)

Performance

- Maximum speed: 140 mph (225 km/h, 120 kn)
- Cruise speed: 115 mph (185 km/h, 100 kn)
- Range: 400 mi (645 km, 350 nmi)
- Service ceiling: 12,500 ft (3,800 m)
- Rate of climb: 750 ft/min (3.8 m/s)

== See also ==
Aircraft of comparable role, configuration, and era

- Piper PA-25 Pawnee
