= Schretzmann S.W.1 Pegasus =

S.W.1 Pegasus

General information
- Type: Single seat sports aircraft
- National origin: Switzerland
- Designer: Walter Schretzmann
- Number built: 1

History
- First flight: 4 November 1972

The Schretzmann S.W.1 Pegasus is a Swiss homebuilt single seat sports aircraft first flown in 1972. Only one was built.

== Design and development ==
The Pegasus was designed and built by Walter Schretzmann, who began its construction in April 1968. It first flew in November 1972. It is an all wood aircraft with wooden spars, frames and entirely plywood covered. All flying surfaces are cantilever structures, the wings low set. The latter have constant chord and carry flaps. The fin and rudder are swept, with a shallow dorsal fin.

The single seat cockpit is covered with a windscreen and a separate, prominent, single piece blown bubble canopy. The Pegasus has a fixed tailwheel undercarriage with oleo-pneumatic shock absorbers within faired legs carrying the main wheels within long wheel spats.

For its first flight the Pegasus was powered by an adapted 100 hp (75 kW) Chevrolet Corvair car engine but proved to be underpowered. A 115 hp (86 kW) flat four Lycoming O-235 was substituted in early 1974 with the expectation of flight in mid-1974.

== Operational history ==
It is not known exactly how long the sole Pegasus HB-YAA remained active. It attended a fly-in at Seppe Airport in the Netherlands in June 1989 and moved to Antwerp in Belgium the following November but was reported as stored there in 1995. The airframe still existed, engineless in 2007 but the Pegasus was not on the European registers in 2010.

== Specifications ==
Data from Jane's All the World's Aircraft 1974-75

General characteristics

- Length: 5.40 m (17 ft 9 in)
- Wingspan: 6.56 m (21 ft 6 in)
- Height: 2.12 m (6 ft 11 in)
- Wing area: 9.00 m^{2} (96.9 sq ft)
- Aspect ratio: 5
- Empty weight: 440 kg (970 lb)
- Max takeoff weight: 630 kg (1,389 lb)
- Powerplant: 1 × Chevrolet Corvair modified flat-six air-cooled car engine, 75 kW (100 hp)
- Propellers: 2-bladed, 1.46 m (4 ft 9 in) diameter

Performance

- Maximum speed: 245 km/h (152 mph, 132 kn)
- Cruise speed: 210 km/h (130 mph, 110 kn) at 70% power
- Stall speed: 95 km/h (59 mph, 51 kn)
- Range: 1,000 km (620 mi, 540 nmi)
- Take-off run: 300 m (984 ft)
- Landing run: 250 m (820 ft)
