= Lee T. Lasseter =

Lee Lasseter
- Born: 1934; Lake Wales, Florida, U.S.
- Died: 1980 (aged 45–46); Lake Wales, Florida, U.S.
- Military career
- Allegiance: United States
- Branch: United States Marine Corps
- Rank: Lieutenant Colonel
- Nickname: "Bear"
- Commands: VMFA-333
- Conflicts: Vietnam War
- Awards: Silver Star Medal; Air Medal

Lee T. "Bear" Lasseter (1934–1980) was an Officer and aviator in the United States Marine Corps. Major Lasseter and his Radar Intercept Officer (RIO) Captain John "Lil" Cummings are the only all USMC aircrew to shoot down a North Vietnam MiG during the Vietnam War. On 11 September 1972, while piloting his F-4J of Marine Fighter Attack Squadron 333(VMFA-333) off the deck of the USS America (CV-66), he and his RIO led a four-ship MigCap mission northeast of Hanoi and successfully shot down a MiG-21 and damaged a second MiG. On egress their F-4J was hit by a Surface to Air Missile (SAM), forcing the crew to eject feet wet out to sea and were successfully rescued.

== Shamrock 201 and VMFA-333 ==
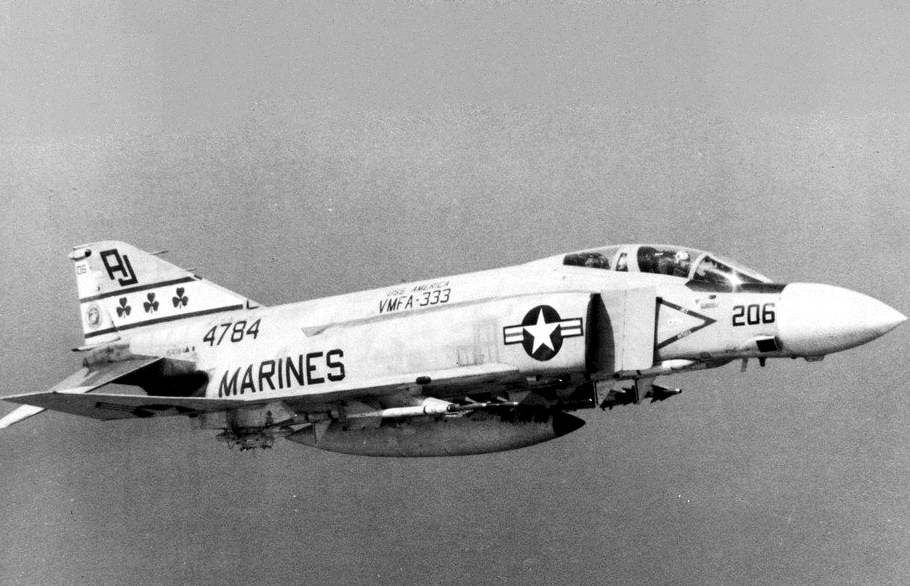
F-4J Phantom of VMFA-333 in flight 1972

Shamrock 201 a USMC F-4J Phantom II, Buno 155526, flew on 11 September 1972, by Lasseter and Cummings while assigned to VMFA-333. The squadron was deployed to Carrier Air Wing Eight (CVW-8) on board USS America. Lasseter, who was the squadron executive officer at the time, was participating in a unit West Pac deployment which represented the first time a USMC fighter attack squadron deployed on a West Pac deployment. Lasseter and Cummings, both TOPGUN graduates, were leading a four-ship sortie to protect an Alpha Strike whose target was 50 miles northeast of Hanoi. Each Shamrock MIGCAP Phantom was armed with four AIM-7 sparrow missiles and four AIM-9 sidewinder missiles and a 600-gallon centerline fuel tank.

== The engagement ==
[This section is under construction as multiple sources are evaluated to accurately describe the engagement.] Following a pre-strike MIGCAP inflight refueling mission Lasseter was radio'ed from Red Crown 'Bandits, 290, for 61'.

== Only three USMC MIG kills ==
There were three (3) confirmed MiG kills credited to U.S. Marines during the Vietnam War. Chances for marine pilots to engage in air-to-air combat was rare, as they were almost exclusively assigned to ground support. The first was on 17 December 1967 in an F-4D against a MiG-17 piloted by Captain Doyle D. Baker, USMC and 1st Lt. John D. Ryan, Jr., U.S. Air Force. The second was on 12 August 1972 in an F-4E against a MiG-21 piloted by Captain Lawrence G. Richard, USMC and Lt. Commander Michael J. Ettel, U.S. Navy. The final one was on 11 September 1972 in an F-4J against a MiG-21 piloted by Major Lee T. (Bear) Lasseter and Captain John D. Cummings.

== Military decorations and awards ==
Lasseter received the Silver Star Medal the third highest military award for his aerial victory in 1972. He was also recognized by the Marine Corps Aviation Association as the Marine Corps Aviator of the year and recipient of the Alfred A. Cunningham Award in 1972.

=== Silver Star citation ===
He was awarded the Silver Star. The citation reads: "The President of the United States takes pleasure in presenting the Silver Star Medal to Lee T. Lasseter (0-74063), Major, U.S. Marine Corps, for conspicuous gallantry and intrepidity in action while serving with, Marine Fighter Attack Squadron, in connection with combat operations against the enemy in the Republic of Vietnam on September 11, 1972. By his courage, aggressive fighting spirit and steadfast devotion to duty in the face of extreme personal danger, Major Lasseter upheld the highest traditions of the Marine Corps and the United States Naval Service."

== Death ==
In 1980, Lasseter underwent gall bladder surgery at the Lake Wales Hospital in Lake Wales, Florida. His wound became severely infected and his wife Shirley had him transferred to naval hospitals Orlando and Bethesda before dying from his post surgery infection. A criminal investigation and lawsuit followed.

== Bibliography ==
- Elward, Brad (2002). US Navy F-4 Phantom II MiG Killers 1972-73. New York City: Osprey Publishing. ISBN 1841762644.
- Dorr, Robert (1996). Vietnam Air War Debrief: The Story of the Aircraft, the Battles, and the Pilots who Fought. UK: Aerospace Publishing. ISBN 978-1880588222.
