= Manuel Hawk =

British single-seat glider, 1972

Hawk

General information
- Type: Glider
- National origin: United Kingdom
- Designer: W.L. Manuel
- Number built: 1

History
- First flight: 25 November 1972

The Manuel Hawk was a homebuilt single-seat glider designed and constructed in the UK around 1970. Only one example was flown.

== Design and development ==
W. L. "Bill" Manuel, who had designed and built a glider as early as 1929 and was later responsible for the Willow Wren, designed the Hawk during his retirement. It was a single-seat aircraft intended for soaring in weak thermals. He built the Hawk himself during 1968 and 1969 before taking it to the College of Aeronautics at Cranfield for structural analysis.

The Hawk was an all-wood, cantilever shoulder wing monoplane. The centre section of the three-piece wing was of constant chord and fitted with parallel-ruler type, upper surface airbrakes positioned at 28.26% of the half-span and at 42% chord. The outer panels were tapered with rounded tips and carried the ailerons. The wing had an angle of incidence of 3° and the outer panels had 3° of dihedral. Structurally, the wings had a spruce main spar at 33% chord with a plywood-covered torsion box ahead of it and fabric covering aft.

The fuselage was a semi-monocoque spruce structure with plywood covering. The fin was also plywood-covered, carrying a fabric-covered rudder which reached from the underside of the T-tail to the bottom of the fuselage. The fixed-incidence tailplane was likewise plywood-covered and the elevator fabric-covered. The latter carried a Flettner-type trim tab on its starboard edge. The Hawk's single seat was forward of the wing and under a hinged, framed canopy. It landed on a single fixed wheel assisted by a tailskid.

The first flight was on 25 November 1972, piloted by Howard Torode of the Cranfield Institute. Tests showed a lack of rudder power, quickly cured by an increase in area, but no other concerns.

== Operational history ==
Only one Hawk was built. It was certified as BGA 1778 by February 1973. In July that year it was at the Sywell PFA weekend, where it gained third place in a competition amongst homebuilt aircraft. Since 2013 it has been preserved by the Gliding Heritage Centre at Lasham.

== Specifications ==
Data from Jane's All the World's Aircraft 1973/74

General characteristics

- Crew: 1
- Length: 20 ft 6 in (6.25 m)
- Wingspan: 42 ft 0 in (12.80 m)
- Height: 4 ft 8 in (1.41 m)
- Wing area: 149 sq ft (13.8 m^{2})
- Aspect ratio: 12
- Airfoil: Wortmann FX6-184 inboard, FX-61-210 tip
- Empty weight: 407 lb (185 kg) equipped
- Max takeoff weight: 640 lb (290 kg)

Performance

- Maximum speed: 91 mph (146 km/h, 79 kn) in smooth air. Like the following performance figures, this speed is for maximum take-off weight
- Stall speed: 36 mph (58 km/h, 31 kn)
- g limits: +4
- Maximum glide ratio: best 25:1 at 41.5 mph (36 kn, 66.5 km/h)
- Rate of sink: 152 ft/min (0.77 m/s) minimum at 38 mph (33 kn, 61 km/h)
- Wing loading: 11.8 lb/sq ft (58 kg/m^{2}) maximum
