= Cooperative (disambiguation) =

A cooperative is an association of persons who cooperate for their mutual benefit.

Cooperative or co-operative or variation, may also refer to:

- Cooperative, having cooperativeness

== A type of cooperative ==
- Housing cooperative, e.g., a co-op apartment in a co-op apartment building
- Building cooperative
- Food cooperative

== Entities named "Cooperative" ==
- The Co-operative (disambiguation), entities with the UK branding
  - The Co-operative brand, used by several UK co-operative businesses
    - The Co-operative Group, the largest co-operative in the UK
- Co-operatives UK
- Co-operative Party
- Cooperatives of Norway
- Federated Co-operatives, a Canadian co-operative federation known for its branded products and stores
- Harvard/MIT Cooperative Society, a cooperative campus store based in Cambridge, Massachusetts, United States

== Other uses ==
- Co-Operative, Kentucky, USA; an unincorporated community
- Cooperative School (disambiguation), multiple schools
  - Co-operative University (disambiguation), multiple universities
  - Cooperative High School, New Haven, Connecticut, USA
- The Cooperative, an informal association of turn-of-the-20th-century French academics
- Ministry of Co-operation, a new Indian government ministry since 2021 for strengthening cooperative movement

== See also ==
- Cooperative game (disambiguation)
- Cooperative Bank (disambiguation), several banks
- Co-operative Party (disambiguation), several political party
- Co-operative Commonwealth (disambiguation)
- Co-operative Insurance Cup (disambiguation)
- Cooperative Hall of Fame, USA
- Operative (disambiguation)
- Coop (disambiguation)
- CO (disambiguation)
