= Apex =

Apex may refer to:

== Arts and media ==
=== Fictional entities ===
- Apex (comics), a teenaged super villainess in the Marvel Universe
- Ape-X, a super-intelligent ape in the Squadron Supreme universe
- Apex, a genetically engineered human population in the TV series The Crossing
- APEX Medical Hospital, a fictional hospital in the Filipino TV series Abot-Kamay na Pangarap

=== Film and television ===
- A.P.E.X., a 1994 science fiction film
- Apex (2021 film), an American action film directed by Edward John Drake and starring Bruce Willis
- Apex (2026 film), action-thriller directed by Baltasar Kormákur and starring Charlize Theron
- Apex: The Story of the Hypercar, a 2015 American documentary
- F1 (film), a sports drama starring Brad Pitt, which was codenamed Apex during development
- "Apex" (Alfred Hitchcock Presents), an episode of the American TV series

=== Literature ===
- Apex (Ramez Naam novel), a 2015 cyber-punk novel
- Apex Magazine, an American horror and science fiction magazine

=== Music ===
- Apex (album), by Canadian heavy metal band Unleash the Archers
- Apex (band), a Polish heavy metal band
- Apex (musician) (1981–2017), British drum and bass music producer and DJ
- The Apex Theory, the former name of the alternative rock band Mt. Helium
- Lord Apex, a rapper from West London, UK

=== Video games ===
- Apex (tournament), a fighting game tournament focusing on Super Smash Bros.
- Racing Evoluzione, also known as Apex, 2003, for the Xbox
- Overwatch Apex, a South Korean Overwatch tournament series
- Apex Legends, 2019, developed by Respawn Entertainment and published by Electronic Arts

== Organizations ==
=== For-profit businesses ===
- APEX Airlines, a charter and scheduled airline based in Yangon, Myanmar
- Apex Digital, a California-based electronics manufacturer
- Apex Hotels, a UK operator of four star hotels
- Apex Records, a former Canadian record label
- Apex Silver Mines, a US-American mining company
- Apex Stores, a Rhode Island–based department store chain
- Apex Studios, a recording studio in Manhattan, New York City
- Apex Tool Group, an American supplier of hand and power tools
- Apple Productivity Experience Group, an operating unit of Microsoft developing software for Apple products

=== Other organizations ===
- Apex (gang), an unstructured criminal gang in Melbourne, Australia
- Apex Clubs of Australia, an association of young individuals
- Association of Professional, Executive, Clerical and Computer Staff, a British Trade Union

== Places ==
- Apex, Arizona
- Apex, Missouri, community in the US
- Apex, North Carolina, town in the US
- Apex, Nunavut, community in Canada
- Apex Park and Recreation District, in Colorado
- Apex Mountain Resort, a ski resort near Penticton, British Columbia, Canada
- Apex Town Hall (historic), Apex, North Carolina
- UFC Apex

== Science and mathematics ==
=== Anatomy ===
- Apex (entomology), the anterior corner of an insect's wing
- Apex (mollusc), the tip of the spire of the shell of a gastropod
- Shoot apex, the apical meristem of a plant or its remnant on a flower
- Root apex (botany), the apical meristem of the root
- Root apex (dental), the extreme end of the root of a tooth
- Apex (leaf), the tip of a leaf
- Apex of lung, the uppermost portion of lung
- Apex of the heart, the lowest superficial part of the heart
- Apex of the tongue, the tip of the tongue

=== Chemistry ===
- Acetone peroxide, a highly explosive organic peroxide
- Ascorbate peroxidase, an enzyme that catalyses the reaction between biotin-phenol and hydrogen peroxide

=== Mathematics ===
- Apex (geometry), the highest vertex in a polyhedron or the point where the two equal sides of an isosceles triangle meet
- Apex graph, a graph that can be made planar by the removal of a single vertex

=== Other sciences ===
- Apex (dinosaur), a fossilized Stegosaurus
- Apex predator, a predator at the top of a food chain, with no natural predators
- Applied Physics Express, a scientific peer-reviewed journal
- Solar apex, the direction in which the Solar System travels through the Milky Way

== Technology ==
=== Computing ===
- Apex (programming language), Java-like proprietary programming language
- Apache Apex, an open-source streaming platform built on top of Hadoop
- Apple Productivity Experience Group, an operating unit of Microsoft developing software for Apple products
- Oracle Application Express, a proprietary Oracle software development system
- BrailleNote Apex, a personal digital assistant for the blind
- Apex, a game engine created by Avalanche Studios

=== Other technologies ===
- Apex (racing), the point a car should touch on the inside of a turn when following a proper line
- Apex (radio band), an experimental very high frequency radio broadcasting system
- Additive System of Photographic Exposure, a system of exposure calculation based on Ev units, or stops
- Advanced Photovoltaic Experiment, a scientific research satellite
- Atacama Pathfinder Experiment, a radio telescope operated by the European Southern Observatory
- R-23 (missile), an air-to-air missile (NATO reporting name "Apex")

== Other uses ==
- Apex (diacritic), an upward pointing shape in certain letters to mark long vowels
- Apex (headdress), a cap worn in ancient Rome
- SS Apex, a Panamanian cargo ship in service 1958–68
- ApEX (Counter-Strike), French Counter-Strike player

== See also ==
- Ampex
- Apical (disambiguation)
- Aphex (disambiguation)
