= Oppy =

Oppy or Oppie may refer to:

== People ==
=== Surname ===
- Graham Oppy (born 1960), Australian professor and author
- Grant Oppy (born 1950), Australian football player
- Jim Oppy (1921–2011), Australian football player
- Max Oppy (1924–2008), Australian football player

=== Nickname ===
- Oppie or Oppy, a nickname for J. Robert Oppenheimer (1904–1967), most often spelled "Oppie", the Manhattan Project leader
- Oppy, the nickname of Hubert Opperman (1904–1996), Australian cyclist and politician
- Oppy, a stagename for Chris Opperman (born 1978) musician
- Oppy, a nickname for David Oppenheim (poker player) (born 1973), U.S. poker player
- Amelia Opdyke Jones (1913–1993), American cartoonist who signed work as "Oppy"

=== Fictional characters ===
- Oppy "Op" Flummel, a fictional character from Extinct (film)
- Oppy the Kangaroo, the race mascot for the Tour Down Under

== Places ==
- Oppy, Pas-de-Calais, a commune of the Pas-de-Calais département, in northern France
- Oppy Mountain, a mountain on the border between Alberta and British Columbia in Canada
- Oppie Burying Ground, Rocky Hill, Somerset County, New Jersey, USA; see List of cemeteries in New Jersey

== Other uses ==
- oppie (slang), a South African word; see List of South African slang words
- Oppy, the nickname of Opportunity (rover), a Mars rover that landed on the planet Mars in 2004
- Shortened form of optimist (dinghy)
- Battle of Oppy, or Capture of Oppy Wood, Oppy, France, in WWI
- Oppy, the Original Poster (OP) in a message forum thread
- Oppy (book), the working title for the 2005 J. Robert Oppenheimer biography American Prometheus

== See also ==
- OPPI (disambiguation)
- Opp (disambiguation)
- OP (disambiguation)
