= Golden Myanmar Airlines =

Burmese airline

Golden Myanmar Airlines ရွှေမြန်မာ လေကြောင်းလိုင်း
IATA	ICAO	Call sign
Y5	GMR	GOLDEN MYANMAR
- Founded: 2012; 14 years ago
- Commenced operations: 11 January 2013
- Ceased operations: 27 March 2022 (reoperations planned)
- Hubs: Yangon International Airport
- Fleet size: 3
- Destinations: 12
- Parent company: Co-operative Bank Ltd, Kaung Myanmar Aung Business Development Enterprise
- Headquarters: Yangon, Myanmar
- Website: www.gmairlines.com

Golden Myanmar Airlines (Burmese: ရွှေမြန်မာ လေကြောင်းလိုင်း) was a low-cost airline in Myanmar that operated domestic and international flights. It was established in August 2012. It was formed by 15 investors including the chairmen of CB Bank and Myanmar Golden Star. The company slogan was Enjoy to fly more.

The airline ceased flight operations on March 27, 2022.

== Destinations ==
As of September 2021, Golden Myanmar Airlines flew to the following destinations:

Country	City	Airport	Notes	Refs
Myanmar	Bagan	Nyaung U Airport		
Myanmar	Dawei	Dawei Airport		
Myanmar	Heho	Heho Airport		
Myanmar	Kawthaung	Kawthaung Airport		
Myanmar	Lashio	Lashio Airport		
Myanmar	Mandalay	Mandalay International Airport	Hub	
Myanmar	Myitkyina	Myitkyina Airport		
Myanmar	Putao	Putao Airport		
Myanmar	Sittwe	Sittwe Airport		
Myanmar	Tachilek	Tachilek Airport		
Myanmar	Thandwe	Thandwe Airport		
Myanmar	Yangon	Yangon International Airport	Hub	
Singapore	Singapore	Changi Airport	Terminated	
Thailand	Bangkok	Suvarnabhumi Airport	Terminated	

== Fleet ==
=== Current fleet ===
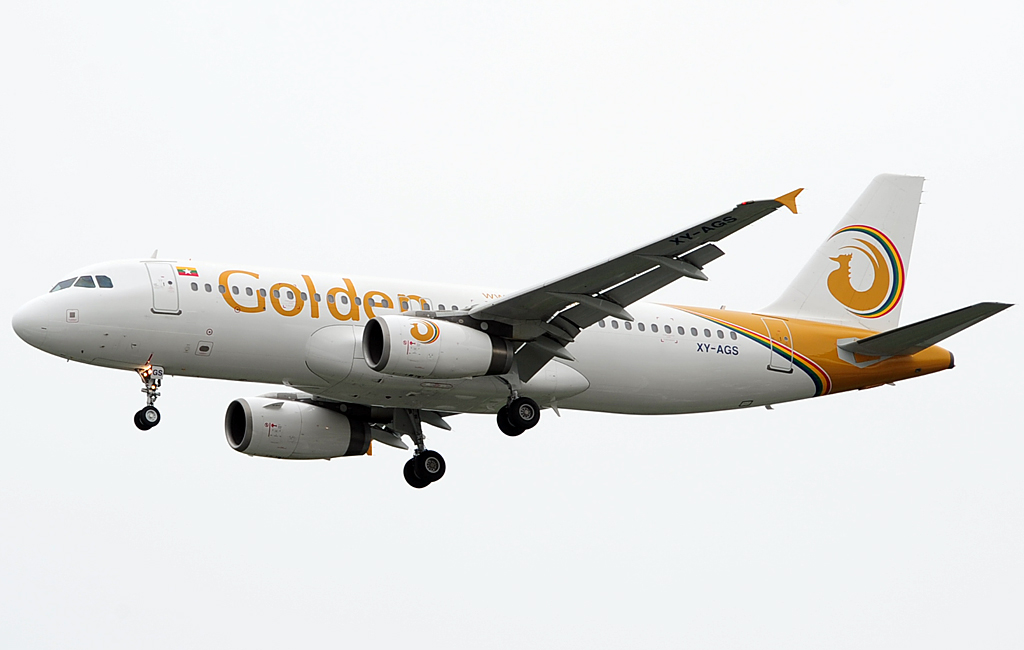
An Airbus A320 of Golden Myanmar Airlines landing at Singapore Changi Airport (April 2013)

When the airline ceased operations, their fleet consisted of the following aircraft:

Golden Myanmar Airlines fleet
Aircraft	In service	Orders	Passengers	Notes
ATR 72-600	3	—	72	
Total	3	—		

=== Former fleet ===
Two Airbus A320 aircraft were used for international routes. These routes were terminated when the airline gave up their final A320. One Airbus A320 was leased from 2012 to 2016. Another A320, leased in 2013, was damaged beyond repair in 2014 and not replaced.

== Incidents and accidents ==
- On 14 April 2014 an Airbus A320 of Golden Myanmar Airlines was damaged beyond repair at Yangon International Airport when it impacted the rear fuselage of another aircraft while being towed. The airframe was moved to Bago in 2016 where it was preserved and used as a restaurant.

== See also ==
- List of defunct airlines of Myanmar
