= OPS =

OPS may refer to:

== Finance and government ==
- Online portfolio selection portfolio management for Stock market
- Old Pension Scheme, a pension scheme in India
- O. Panneerselvam, former chief minister of Tamil Nadu, India
- Obscene Publications Squad, a former unit of the Metropolitan Police in London, England
- Ottawa Police Service
- Office of Public Safety, a former US government agency

== Science, medicine, and technology ==
- Oriented polystyrene
- Optical position sensor, a position sensitive device

=== Biology and medicine ===
- Optical Pooled Screening, a scientific research method
- Orthogonal polarization spectral imaging
- OPS-301, Operationen- und Prozedurenschlüssel, German healthcare procedure classification

=== Computing and telecommunications ===
- Open Pluggable Specification
- Open Publication Structure, a specification for e-books in EPUB format
- Off-premises station, a telephone extension located off-site

== Sports ==
- Oulun Palloseura, a Finnish sports club
- On-base plus slugging, a baseball statistic

== Arts ==
- Oceanic Preservation Society
- Orchestre philharmonique de Strasbourg

== Other uses ==
- Orange Pekoe Superior, a tea leaf grade

== See also ==
- Ops (disambiguation)
- OP (disambiguation)
- OOPS (disambiguation)
- OPPS (disambiguation)
