= Co-operative Bank =

Co-operative Bank or Cooperative Bank may refer to:

- The Co-operative Bank, a bank in the United Kingdom
- Coop Bank, a bank operated by Coop amba in Denmark.
- The Co-operative Bank (New Zealand), New Zealand bank, formerly known as PSIS
- Co-operative Bank Ltd, Myanmar bank
- Cooperative Bank of Kenya, Kenyan bank
- Cooperative Bank of Misamis Oriental, Philippine bank
- Cooperative Bank of Tarlac, Philippine bank
- Cooperative Desjardins Bank, Cooperative financial group, Québec
- Cooperative banks in Germany, see Bundesverband der Deutschen Volksbanken und Raiffeisenbanken
- Coop Bank (Switzerland), founded by the Coop and now owned by the Basler Kantonalbank
- OP Financial Group, in which “OP” stands for “osuuspankki”, meaning “cooperative bank” in Finnish

== Other uses ==
- Co-operative Permanent Building Society, earlier name of Nationwide Building Society in the UK
- The Co-operative Credit Union, a savings and loans co-operative in the UK

== See also ==
- Credit union
- Cooperative banking
- The Co-operative Banking Group, UK banking and insurance group
- Cooperative (disambiguation)
