= The Co-operative =

The Co-operative branding may refer to:

== Brands ==
The Co-operative brand - the umbrella brand used by constituents of the British co-operative movement, most notably:

- The Co-operative Food - the greatest number of outlets
- The Co-operative Bank
- The Co-operative Credit Union
- The Co-operative Energy
- The Co-operative Funeralcare
- The Co-operative Insurance
- The Co-operative Legal Services
- The Co-operative Mobile
- The Co-operative Party
- The Co-operative Travel

== Organisations ==
The users of The Co-operative brand, notably:

- The Co-operative Group - the UK's largest
- The Co-operative Banking Group
- The Co-operative Party
- The Central England Co-operative
- The Channel Islands Co-operative Society
- The Chelmsford Star Co-operative Society
- The Midcounties Co-operative
- The Phone Co-op
- The Southern Co-operative

== Movements ==
The British co-operative movement

== See also ==
- The Cooperative, group of French academics
- Cooperative (disambiguation)
- Operative (disambiguation)
- Coop (disambiguation)
