= Cooperative School =

Cooperative School, or variant, may refer to:

- cooperative school, a type of school in the UK
- parent cooperative, a type of school where parents participant in governance and operations
- Cooperative High School, New Haven, Connecticut, US
- Paris Cooperative High School, Paris, Illinois, US
- Majuro Cooperative School, Majuro, Marshall Islands
- Cochabamba Cooperative School, Cochabamba, Bolivia
- American Cooperative School (disambiguation)
- Co-operative University (disambiguation)

== See also ==
- cooperative learning
- co-operative education
- co-operative studies
- Co-operative College, a British school charity
- Cooperativeness
- Cooperative
- Cooperative (disambiguation)
- School (disambiguation)
- Coop (disambiguation)
