= People's Coop =

People's Coop or People's Co-op or variation, may refer to:

- People's Food Co-op, of Portland, Oregon, USA; an organization
- People's Co-op Building, in Lehi, Utah, USA; an NRHP listed building

== See also ==
- Cooperative
- List of co-operatives
- Co-operative Party (disambiguation)
- Coop (disambiguation), including co-op
- Credit union
- Trade union / labor union
- Communism
- Socialism
- Marxism
- Communist party (disambiguation)
- Socialist party (disambiguation)
- Peoples (disambiguation)
