= OPP =

OPP, O.P.P., or Opp may refer to:

== Government ==
- NASA's Office of Planetary Protection
- One Police Plaza (1PP), the Police headquarters in New York City
- Ontario Provincial Police, the provincial police service of Ontario, Canada
- Opp, Alabama, a city in the United States
- Orleans Parish Prison, prison located in New Orleans, United States

== Miscellaneous other organizations ==
- Omega Psi Phi, an international fraternity
- One People's Project, an anti-racist group
- Opp (newspaper), published in Oppdal, Norway
- Open Prosthetics Project, a project dedicated to creation of public domain prosthetics
- Orangi Pilot Project, a development project in slums of Karachi, Pakistan

== Politics ==
- Opportunity Party, a political party in New Zealand

== Science and technology ==
- Object Push Profile, a Bluetooth communications protocol based on the OBEX protocol
- Octonionic projective plane, or Cayley plane, a projective plane over the octonions
- Oriented polypropylene, and specifically BOPP (biaxially oriented PP), a polymer used mainly for packaging and labeling
- Ortho-phenylphenol, or 2-phenylphenol, an organic compound used as a fungicide
- Ovine progressive pneumonia, or ovine lentivirus, a chronic infection of Visna virus that affects sheep
- Yamaha YM2164, an FM synthesis sound chip also called FM Operator Type P (OPP)

== Songs ==
- "O.P.P." (song), a song by Naughty by Nature from the album Naughty by Nature

== Concepts ==
- Obligatory passage point, a concept in sociology

== See also ==
- Opposition (disambiguation), shortened
- Opps (disambiguation)
- OP (disambiguation)
