= American Cooperative School =

American Cooperative School may refer to:

- American Cooperative School of La Paz, Bolivia
- American Cooperative School of Tunis, in El Aouina, Tunisia

== See also ==
- American (disambiguation)
- American School (disambiguation)
- Cooperative School (disambiguation)
- Cooperative (disambiguation)
- School (disambiguation)
