= FMI Air =

Airline in Myanmar

FMI AIR
IATA	ICAO	Call sign
ND	FMI	GECKO
- Founded: 2012; 14 years ago
- Commenced operations: September 2012
- Ceased operations: August 2018
- Operating bases: Yangon International Airport
- Fleet size: 4
- Destinations: 7
- Headquarters: Yangon, Myanmar
- Key people: Tin Maung Aye
- Website: www.fmiair.com

FMI Air was a scheduled airline based in Yangon, Myanmar.

== History ==
FMI Air Charter was established on 9 September 2012 operating charter flights from Yangon Airport to Nay Pyi Taw. The airline was renamed in 2015 and launched services as FMI Air in May 2015. FMI Air operated daily flights (17 x week ) between the commercial hub, Yangon International Airport and Naypyidaw International Airport. In addition to scheduled flights FMI Air offered Charter flight services to over 20 airports within Myanmar.

The airline ceased operations in August 2018 after struggling to find a business partner.

== Services ==
FMI Air was a schedule service airline offering a Premium Service to both the growing corporate and leisure sectors which include complimentary access to lounges and concierge services. FMI Air has its own APP ( FMI AIR ) to assist international travellers. FMI Air provided scheduled air services to Myanmar's Capital Nay Pyi Taw, Bagan, Heho, Mandalay, Sittwe, Thandwe, Kawthaung, Myitkyina. FMI Air was Myanmar's #3 airline in terms of fleet size with plans to grow its domestic network in 2017/18 as well operate internationally. FMI Air has recently been rated as Myanmar's Preferred choice LEISURE AIRLINE because of its network customer experience.

== Destinations ==
FMI Air operated schedule flights from YANGON to the below destinations.

- Nay Pyi Taw International Airport
- Sittwe Airport
- Mandalay International Airport
- Heho Airport which services Inle Lake
- Nyaung U Airport which service Bagan
- Thandwe Airport which serves Ngpali Beach
- Kawthaung Airport
- Dawei Airport
- Myeik Airport
- Yangon International Airport

== Fleet ==
=== Current fleet ===
The FMI Air fleet consisted of the following aircraft (as of August 2018):

FMI Air fleet
Aircraft	In service	Orders	Notes
ATR 72-600	2		
Bombardier CRJ200LR	2		
Total	4		

=== Former fleet ===
FMI Air Charter used the following aircraft (as of October 2015):

- ATR 42
- ATR 72
- Beechcraft 1900D

== See also ==
- List of defunct airlines of Myanmar
