= List of defunct airlines of Myanmar =

This is a list of defunct airlines of Myanmar.

Airline	Image	IATA	ICAO	Callsign	Commenced operations	Ceased operations	Notes
Air Bagan		W9	JAB	AIR BAGAN	2004	2018	
Air Mandalay		6T	AMY	AIR MANDALAY	1994	2018	
Air KBZ		K7	KBZ	JADE AIR	2010	2024	Rebranded as Mingalar Aviation Services
APEX Airlines		SO			2015	2018	
Burma Airways		UB	UBA	UNIONAIR	1972	1989	Rebranded as Myanma Airways
FMI Air		ND	FMI	GECKO	2012	2018	
Golden Myanmar Airlines		Y5	GMR	GOLDEN MYANMAR	2012	2022	
Myanma Airways		UB	UBA	UNION AIR	1989	2014	Rebranded as Myanmar National Airlines
Union of Burma Airways		UB	UBA	UNION AIR	1948	1972	Rebranded as Burma Airways

== See also ==
- List of airlines of Myanmar
- List of airports in Myanmar
