= Cooperator =

Cooperator may refer to:

- cooperators of Opus Dei
- a cooperative member
- Cooperation
- Contingent cooperator
  - see also: Collaboration
- Frater et Cooperator Imperii ("Brother and Partner of the Empire") title given to Boleslaus I of Poland
- Operator (disambiguation)

== See also ==
- The Co-operators, a Canadian insurance co-operative
