= Ops (disambiguation) =

Ops may refer to:

- Ops − a Roman goddess in the ancient Roman religion
- Ops (mythology) − figures in Greek mythology
- Operations (disambiguation)

== See also ==
- OP (disambiguation)
- OPS (disambiguation)
- OOPS (disambiguation)
- OPPS (disambiguation)
