= Emily Wachspress =

American singer

Emily Wachspress (born November 9, 1996), better known by her stage name EM, is an American pop music singer and songwriter from New Jersey. Her songs like Hear Your Love charted at number 20 on the Billboard Adult Contemporary chart.

== Life ==
Wachspress was born in Vineland, New Jersey and later moved to Voorhees Township where she finished her education at Voorhees Middle School and Eastern High School. Her song Say What You Mean charted number 2 on DRT and 24 on Billboards Adult Contemporary. With the second single, Hear Your Love at number 20 on Billboard Adult Contemporary and 17 on Mediabase.

== Discography ==
- Hear Your Love
- Say What You Mean
- Dear Life
- You Yourself And I
- Even When It Hurts
- On Time
- Blue Light
