= American School =

American School may refer to:

== Schools ==
- American School (economics)
- American School (Panama)
- American School (Yemen)
- American School of Correspondence
- American School of Bombay
- American School in Japan
- American Schools and Hospitals Abroad
- Corporación Educativa American School
- ASF Mexico (American School in Mexico City)
- Escuela Americana El Salvador (American School El Salvador)
- American School of Tegucigalpa
- American School for the Deaf

== Other ==
- The American School (painting), a 1765 by Matthew Pratt
- The American School (novel), a 1954 book by Nobuo Kojima

== See also ==
- Category:American international schools
- American International School (disambiguation)
- American Cooperative School (disambiguation)
- Education in the United States
- List of international schools
