= APEX Airlines =

Airline in Myanmar

APEX AIRLINES
IATA	ICAO	Call sign
SO	-	-
- Founded: 2012; 14 years ago
- Commenced operations: March 2015
- Ceased operations: August 2018
- Operating bases: Naypyidaw International Airport
- Focus cities: Yangon International Airport
- Fleet size: 1
- Destinations: 5
- Headquarters: Yangon, Myanmar
- Website: www.apexairline.com

APEX Airlines was a charter and scheduled airline based in Yangon, Myanmar. APEX provided scheduled air services to Myanmar's commercial city Yangon and to Tanintharyi Region with daily flights. Its main base was Naypyidaw International Airport.

== History ==
APEX Airline Public Company Limited (APEX Airlines) was incorporated on 27 November 2012 for the purpose of providing International and Domestic Air Transport Services and was awarded a provisional Air Operator's Certificate (AOC) to commence its startup process. APEX Airlines was operational and started to serve passengers in March 2015.

The airline ceased operations and handed back its licence to the authorities in August 2018.

== Destinations ==
APEX Airlines offered scheduled services to:

- Myanmar
  - Mandalay Region
  - Naypyidaw - Naypyidaw International Airport Base
  - Tanintharyi Region
    - Dawei - Dawei Airport
    - Kawthaung - Kawthaung Airport
    - Myeik - Myeik Airport
  - Yangon Region
    - Yangon - Yangon International Airport

== Fleet ==
The APEX Airlines fleet consisted of the following aircraft (as of September 2017):

APEX Airlines fleet
Aircraft	In service	Orders	Notes
ATR 72-600	1	0	
Total	1		

== See also ==
- List of defunct airlines of Myanmar
