= New Balance Nationals Outdoor =

High school track and field meet

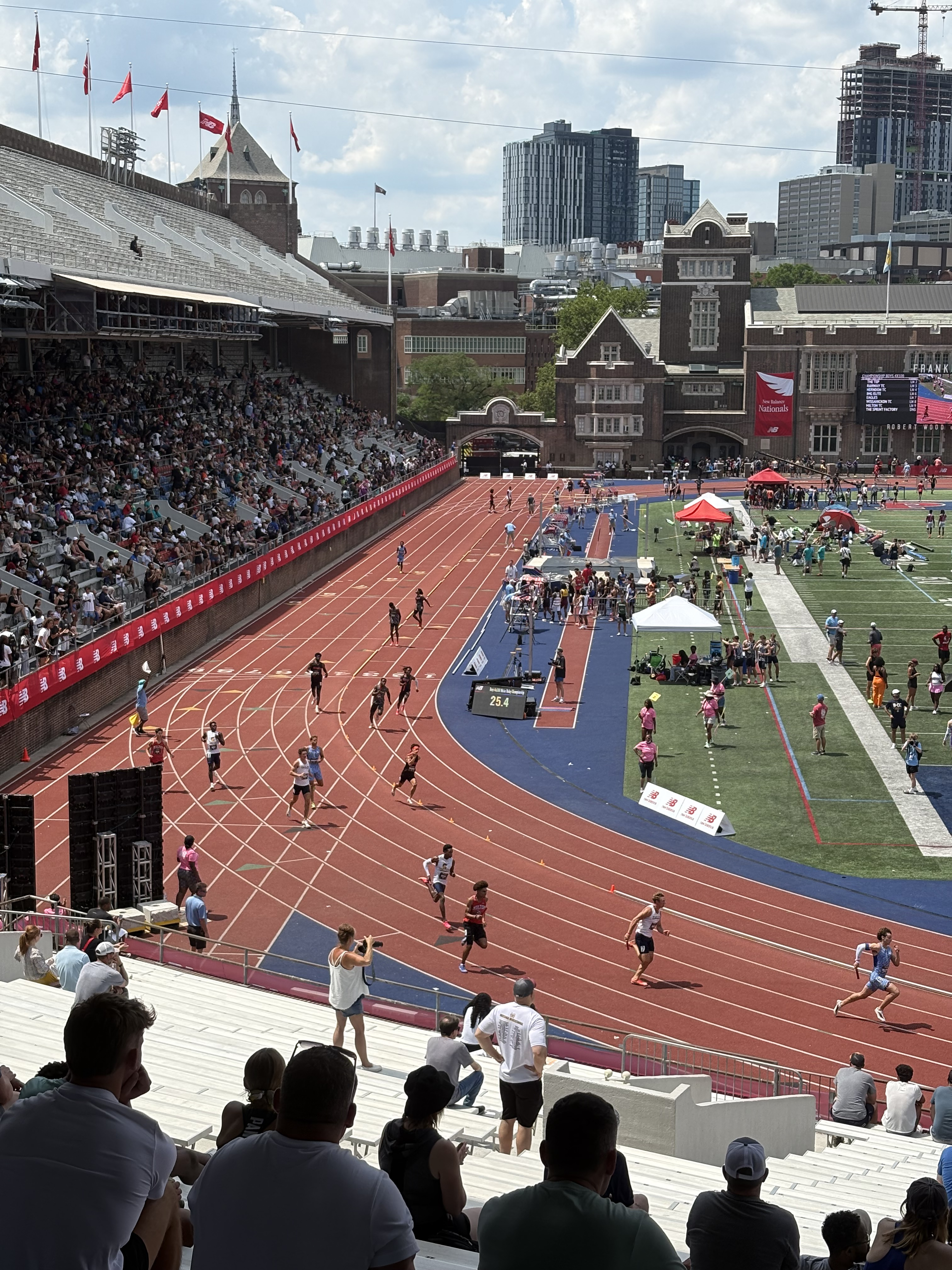
- 2025 New Balance Nationals at Franklin Field
- Genre: Outdoor Track & Field
- Frequency: Annually
- Venue: Franklin Field
- Location: Philadelphia
- Country: United States
- Years active: 2022-
- Sponsor: New Balance
- Website: https://nbnationalsout.com/

The New Balance Nationals Outdoor is a high school track and field meet in the United States. The meet is held at Franklin Field at the University of Pennsylvania in Philadelphia, Pennsylvania on the third weekend in June each year.

New Balance previously sponsored a national high school meeting organized by the National Scholastic Athletic Foundation. However, there was a sponsorship change in 2022. In the same year, New Balance would go on to sponsor a new national high school meeting and kept the same meeting name.

== Meet records ==
=== Boys ===
Event	Record	Athlete	Club/School	Edition	Ref/Notes
100 m	9.95 (+1.2 m/s)	Christian Miller	Creekside High School	2024	
200 m	20.55 (+0.1 m/s)	Jake Odey-Jordan	Archbishop Carroll High School	2024	
400 m	45.13	Quincy Wilson	Bullis School	2024	
800 m	1:46.48	Cade Flatt	Marshall County High School	2022	
1 mile	3:59.00	Drew Griffith	Butler Area Senior High School	2024	
2 mile	8:41.23	Daniel Simmons		2023	
5000 m	14:20.89	Noah Bontrager	Westview Junior-Senior High School	2025	
110 m hurdles	13.42 (+1.4 m/s)	Bradley Franklin	Thompson High School	2024	
400 m hurdles	51.31	Yougendy Mauricette	Sussex Technical High School	2022	
2000 m steeplechase	5:37.60	Nicholas Mazzeo	Lower Merion High School	20 June 2026	
1 mile walk	6:46.15	Ian Britt	Mt. Ararat High School	2025	
4 × 100 m relay	40.47		Parkland Magnet High School	2024	
4 × 200 m relay	1:23.64		Archbishop Carroll High School	2025	
4 × 400 m relay	3:08.28		Bullis School	2025	
4 × 800 m relay	7:26.12	Jonah Tang (1:54.74); Micah Tang (1:52.52); Tayshaun Ogomo (1:48.94); Jackson Spencer (1:49.94)	Herriman High School	2025	High school record
4 × mile relay	16:54.80		Oregon Distance Project	2025	
800 m sprint medley relay	3:23.08		West Springfield High School	2022	
Distance medley relay	9:44.30		Crater High School	2024	
4 × 110 m shuttle hurdle relay	57.81		Ann Arbor Youth Track Club	2024	
Long jump	7.74 m (25 ft 4+3/4 in)	DJ Fillmore	Licking Heights High School	2023	
Triple jump	15.70 m (51 ft 6+1/4 in)	Khalil Antione	Co-op High School	2024	
High jump	2.20 m (7 ft 2+1/4 in)	Khalil Antione	Co-op High School	2024	
Pole vault	5.30 m (17 ft 4 1/2 in)	Garrett Guinther	Sidney High School	2025	
Shot put	20.34 m (66 ft 8 3/4 in)	Joshua Huisman		2024	
Discus throw	61.42 m (201 ft 6 in)	Michael Pinckney	High School for Construction Trades, Engineering and Architecture	2022	
Javelin throw	65.56 m (215 ft 1 in)	Drew Mruk	Wyoming Area High School	2022	
Hammer throw	73.49 m (241 ft 1 in)	Tarik Robinson-O'Hagan	Woonsocket High School	2022	
Decathlon	7092 points	Winston Schroder	IMG Academy	2025	

=== Girls ===
Event	Record	Athlete	School	Edition	Notes
100 m	11.26 (+1.3 m/s)	Lisa Raye	West Warwick High School	2024	
200 m	22.44 (+0.4 m/s)	Elise McDonogh	McDonogh School	2025	
400 m	51.14	Natalie Dumas	Eastern Regional High School	2025	
800 m	2:00.11	Natalie Dumas	Eastern Regional High School	2025	
1 mile	4:33.67	Paige Sheppard	Union Catholic Regional High School	2025	Under 16 world record
2 mile	9:55.48	Hanne Thomsen	Montgomery High School	2025	
5000 m	16:18.14	Calysta Garmer	Webb School of Knoxville	2025	
100 m hurdles	13.36 (−0.3 m/s)	Camden Bentley	Gahanna-Lincoln High School	2023	
400 m hurdles	55.99	Natalie Dumas	Eastern Regional High School	2025	
2000 m steeplechase	6:19.53	Angelina Napoleon		2023	
1 mile walk	7:07.31	Taylor Farrell	Corning Painted-Post High School	2024	
4 × 100 m relay	44.80		Bullis School	2025	
4 × 200 m relay	1:33.71		Bullis School	2023	
4 × 400 m relay	3:31.68		Montverde Academy	2024	
4 × 800 m relay	8:34.20		Union Catholic Regional High School	2024	
4 × mile relay	20:03.82		Purple Track Club	2024	
4 × 100 m shuttle hurdle relay	55.97		Bullis School	2023	
800 m sprint medley relay	3:56.73		Burnt Hills Track Club	2024	
Distance medley relay	11:12.20		Union Catholic Regional High School	2025	High school record
Long jump	6.42 m (21 ft 3/4 in)	Alyssa Jones	Miami Southridge Senior High School	2022	
Triple jump	12.98 m (42 ft 7 in)	Alexandra Kelly	Rocky Point High School	2022	
High jump	1.80 m (5 ft 10 3/4 in)	Egypt Bolan	Lindenwold High School	2025	
Pole vault	4.20 m (13 ft 9 1/4 in)	Veronica Vacca	Mount Saint Joseph Academy	2025	
Shot put	15.29 m (50 ft 1 3/4 in)	Jessica Oji	Livingston High School	2024	
Discus throw	54.48 m (178 ft 8 3/4 in)	Hannah Nuhfer	Delsea Regional High School	2025	
Javelin throw	48.78 m (160 ft 1/4 in)	Shea Greene	Weston High School	2022	
Hammer throw	57.51 m (188 ft 8 in)	Mia Hoskins	Coventry High School	2025	
Heptathlon	5582 points	Yuliya Maslouskaya	IMG Academy	2025	
