= Operative =

Operative may refer to:

- Operative Media, an advertising company, founded 2000
- The Operative (film), a 2019 thriller film
- The Operative (Firefly), a character from the Firefly media franchise
- The Operative: No One Lives Forever, a 2000 video game

== See also ==
- Agent (disambiguation)
- Cooperative (disambiguation)
- Operation (disambiguation)
- Operator (disambiguation)
- OP (disambiguation)
