= FMI =

FMI may refer to:

- Danish Defence Acquisition and Logistics Organization (Danish: Forsvarets Materiel- og Indkøbsstyrelse)
- Finnish Meteorological Institute
- First Myanmar Investment
- FMI Air, a Burmese airline
- Food Marketing Institute, an American trade association
- Foundation Medicine, an American biotechnology company
- Freedom Movement of Iran, a political organization
- Friedrich Miescher Institute for Biomedical Research, Switzerland
- Functional Mock-up Interface, in computer simulation
- International Monetary Fund, abbreviated FMI in many Romance languages (for example: French: Fonds monétaire international)
- Kalemie Airport, in Katanga Province, Democratic Republic of the Congo
- People's Movement Against Immigration (Norwegian: Folkebevegelsen mot innvandring)
