= Co-operative Party (disambiguation) =

The Co-operative Party is a political party in the United Kingdom.

Co-operative Party may also refer to:

- Japan Cooperative Party (1945–46)
- Japan Cooperative Party (1946–47)
- National Cooperative Party, Japan
- New Zealand Co-operative Party
- Democratic Co-operative Party, Namibia
- Nepal Co-operative Party
- Co-operative Commonwealth Federation, Canada
- People's Co-operative Commonwealth Federation, British Columbia, Canada

== See also ==
- list of co-operatives
- Coop (disambiguation)
- Cooperative (disambiguation)
