= Opdalingen =

Norwegian newspaper

- Type: Local
- Format: Tabloid and online
- Owner: Amedia
- Founded: 1934
- Language: Norwegian
- City: Oppdal Municipality and Rennebu Municipality
- Country: Norway
- Circulation: 2,214 (as of 2013)
- Website: opdalingen.no

Opdalingen is a local online and print newspaper published in Oppdal Municipality and Rennebu Municipality, Norway. Published in tabloid format, the newspaper had a circulation of 2,214 in 2013. The newspaper is owned by Amedia. It has three weekly issues, on Tuesdays, Thursdays, and Saturdays. The newspaper was founded in 1934 and competes with Opp.
