= Opps =

Opps or OPPS may refer to:

- Bacha Khan International Airport (ICAO airport code OPPS), Peshawar, Khyber Pakhtunkhwa, Pakistan
- "Opps", a 2018 song by Vince Staples and Yugen Blakrok from the soundtrack album Black Panther: The Album
- "Opps", a 2019 song by JayDaYoungan off the album Can't Speak On It
- Outpatient Prospective Payment System, a part of the U.S. government Ambulatory Payment Classification

== See also ==
- OOPS (disambiguation)
- OPP (disambiguation), for the singular of OPPs
- OPS (disambiguation)
- Ops (disambiguation)
- Opposition (disambiguation)
