= Oops =

Oops may refer to:

- "Oops!", an interjection

== Television and film ==
- "Oops" (Frasier episode), an episode of the TV sitcom Frasier
- "Oops" (Family Ties episode), an episode of the TV sitcom Family Ties
- Oops! (film), a 2003 Hindi drama film
- Ooops! (Canadian game show), 1970–1971

== Music ==
- "Oops!" (Super Junior song), 2011
- "Oops!" (Yung Gravy song), 2021
- "Oops (Oh My)", a 2002 song by Tweet featuring Missy Elliott
- "Hit 'Em Up Style (Oops!)", a 2001 song by Blu Cantrell
- "Oops", recorded by Louis Armstrong with Ella Fitzgerald in 1951
- "Oops", a 1962 song by Bill Doggett and His Combo
- "Oops", a 1966 song by Neil Christian
- "Oops!", a 1985 song by Rare Silk from American Eyes
- "Oops", a 2016 song by Little Mix from Glory Days
- "Oops!", a 2020 song by Loona from 12:00
- "Oops!", a 2025 song by Illit from Bomb
- Ooops, a 1991 song by 808 State featuring Björk

== Other ==
- Linux kernel oops, a response created from the abnormal operation of the Linux kernel
- Object-oriented programming system
- Out of Phase Stereo

== See also ==
- OPPS (disambiguation)
- OOP (disambiguation)
- OPS (disambiguation)
- Ops (disambiguation)
- Interjection
