= Aphex =

Aphex may refer to:

- Aphex Systems, a maker of audio processing equipment
- Aphex Twin, a British electronic music artist

== See also ==
- Apex (disambiguation)
