= Julia Udine =

American musical theater actress (born 1993)

- Born: August 12, 1993 (age 33); Camden, New Jersey, U.S.
- Education: Pennsylvania State University
- Occupations: Singer; actress

Julia Rose Udine is an American theater actress best known for playing the role of Christine Daaé in The Phantom of the Opera in the U.S. tour and on Broadway.

== Biography ==
Udine was born in Camden, New Jersey, on August 12, 1993, and grew up in nearby Voorhees Township. She graduated from Eastern Regional High School in 2011 and briefly attended Pennsylvania State University before moving to New York to train at the T. Schreiber Conservatory and later, the Broadway Dance Center.

While at Broadway Dance Center, Udine found a casting agent and auditioned for Jack's Back, an off-off-Broadway show, which she landed. Before she landed the lead role in The Phantom of the Opera, Udine auditioned and attended casting calls for many other roles.

From 2013 to 2014, Udine played the role of Christine Daaé in the U.S. national tour of Andrew Lloyd Webber's musical The Phantom of the Opera. She joined the Broadway cast on December 15, 2014.

A year later, Udine played Mabel in the New York City Center production of The Pirates of Penzance. Udine also starred in the one-woman Andrew Lloyd Webber musical Tell Me on a Sunday and Shrek the Musical at Philadelphia's Walnut Street Theater.

Udine's TV appearances include Law and Order: SVU and All My Children.

== Performance credits ==
Year(s)	Production	Role	Location	Category
2010	West Side Story	Maria	Haddonfield Plays and Players	Regional
2012	Jack's Back	Jenny	Gloria Maddox Theatre	Off-Off-Broadway
2013–2014, 2016	The Phantom of the Opera	Christine Daaé	Various	US Tour
2014–2016, 2021–2023	The Phantom of the Opera	Christine Daaé	Majestic Theatre	Broadway
2015	The Pirates of Penzance	Mabel	New York City Center	Off-Broadway
2018	Tell Me On a Sunday	Girl	Walnut Street Theatre	Regional
2019–2020	Shrek the Musical	Princess Fiona	Walnut Street Theatre	Regional
2024	Sunset Boulevard	Betty Schaefer	Broadway Sacramento	Regional
