= OPPI =

OPPI or oppi may refer to:

== People ==
- Oppi (musician), Indonesian musician, member of the band Jamrud (band)
- Oppi Untracht (1922–2008), U.S. master metalsmith
- Giorgio Oppi (1940–2022), Italian politician
- Ubaldo Oppi (1889–1942), Italian painter

== Places ==
- Pasni Airport (ICAO airport code OPPI), Pasni City, Balochistan, Pakistan

== Other uses ==
- Organisation Of Plastic Processors of India; see List of regulators in India

== See also ==
- Oppy (disambiguation)
