= Air Mandalay =

Regional Airline of Myanmar

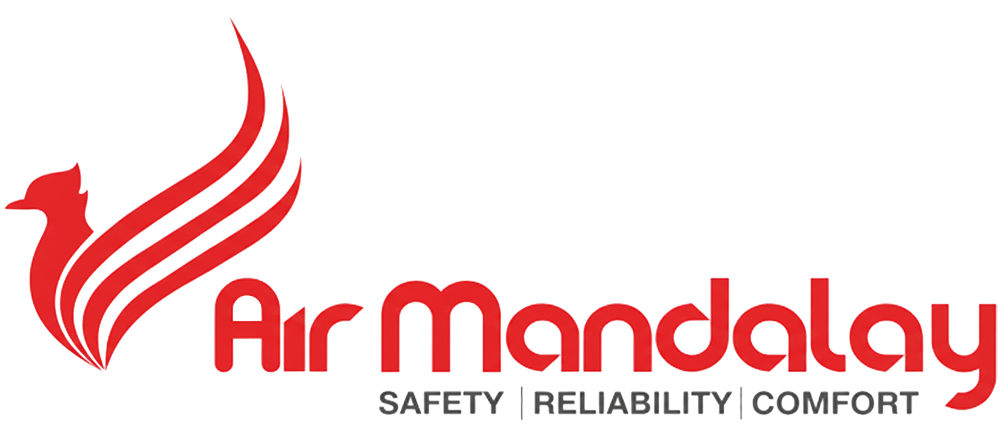
| IATA | ICAO | Call sign |
|---|---|---|
| 6T | AMY | AIR MANDALAY |
- Founded: 6 October 1994
- Commenced operations: 18 October 1994
- Ceased operations: 4 September 2018
- Operating bases: Yangon International Airport; Mandalay International Airport
- Fleet size: Nil
- Destinations: Nil
- Parent company: Air Mandalay Ltd. Myanmar Airways International
- Headquarters: Yangon, Myanmar
- Website: www.airmandalay.com

Air Mandalay (Burmese: အဲမန္တလေး) was a regional airline based in Yangon. Its main base was Yangon International Airport. In early April 2015, two newly leased Embraer ERJ 145 jets joined its fleet.

== History ==
The airline was established on 6 October 1994 and started operations on 18 October that year with a flight from Yangon to Mandalay. It was the first domestic and regional joint venture airline in Myanmar. Director of Flight Operations was Captain Zaw Thein, and Chief Pilot was Captain James Keep. On 27 August 1995, Air Mandalay started its first international service from Yangon to Chiang Mai in Thailand.

The airline ceased operations on September 4, 2018 amidst overcapacity in Myanmar's aviation market with all of its flights incorporated by Myanmar National Airlines.

== Destinations ==
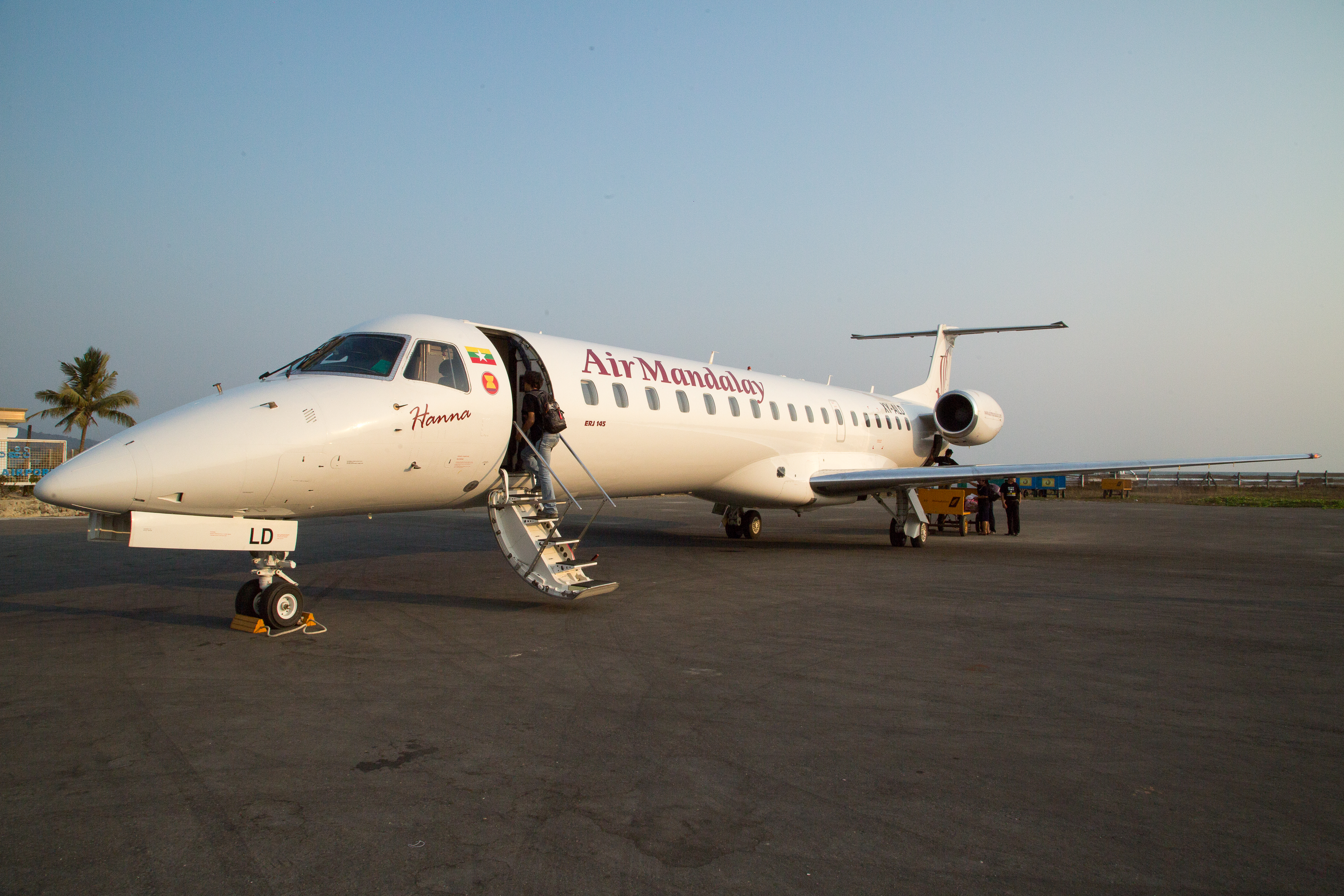
Air Mandalay ERJ145

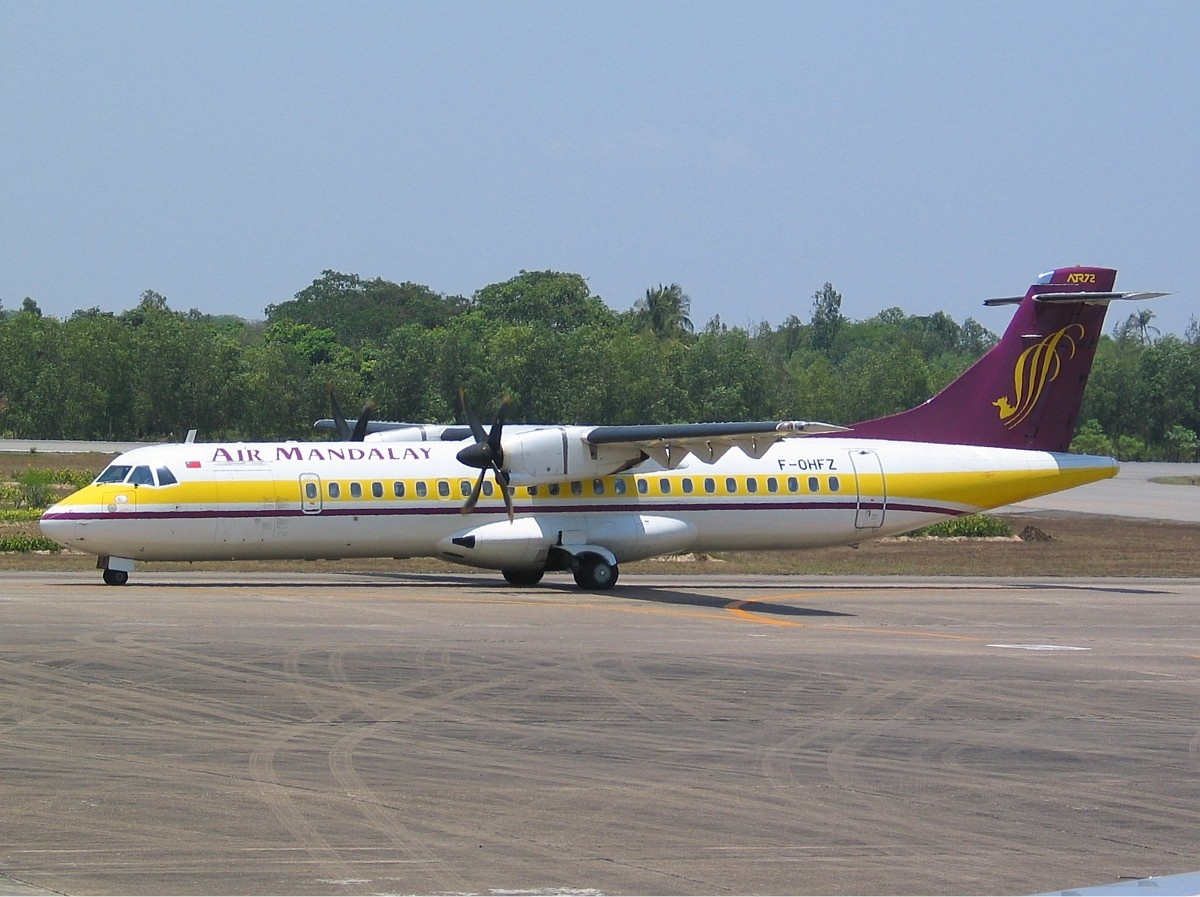
Air Mandalay ATR 72 at Yangon Airport

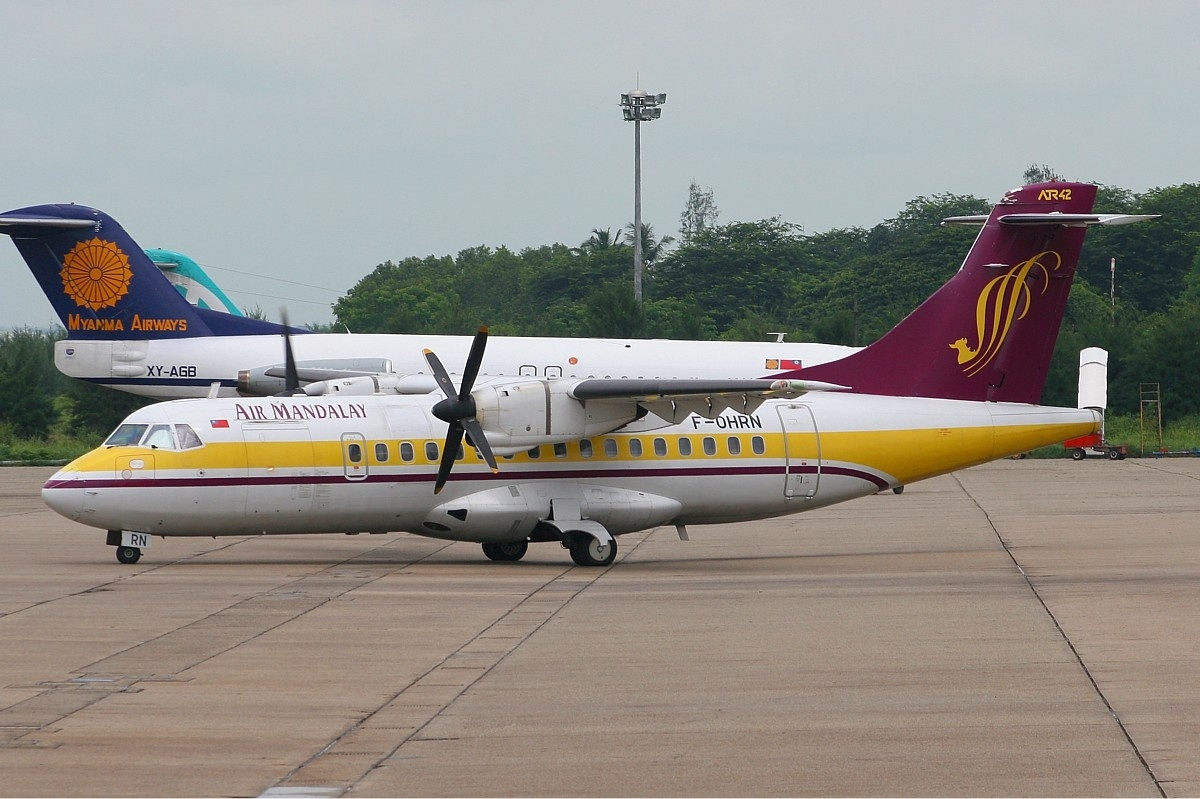
Air Mandalay ATR 42 at Yangon Airport

Air Mandalay served the following destinations (as of August 2018):

Myanmar

- Mandalay - Mandalay International Airport, secondary hub
- Sittwe – Sittwe Airport
- Tachilek – Tachilek Airport
- Yangon – Yangon International Airport, main hub
- Myitkyina – Myitkyina Airport

== Fleet ==
=== Current fleet ===
As of August 2018 the Air Mandalay fleet comprised the following aircraft:

Air Mandalay fleet
| Aircraft | In fleet | Orders | Notes |
|---|---|---|---|
| Embraer ERJ-145/ER | 2 | — | |
| Embraer ERJ-145/LR | 1 | — | |
| Mitsubishi SpaceJet M90 | — | Cancelled | |
| Total | 3 | — | |

=== Former fleet ===
- 3 ATR 42-320
- 4 ATR 72-212

== See also ==
- List of airlines of Myanmar
