= Natalie Dumas =

American hurdler and sprinter (born 2008)

Personal information
- Nationality: United States
- Born: August 7, 2008 (age 18)

Sport
- Sport: Athletics
- Event: 400 meters

Achievements and titles
- Personal bests: 400 m: 51.14; 800 m: 2:00.11; 400 mH: 55.99
Medal record
Women's athletics
Representing United States
World U20 Championships
Gold medal – first place	2026 Eugene	4x400 m mixed

Natalie Dumas is an American hurdler and sprinter who competes in the 400 meters for Eastern Regional High School in Voorhees Township, New Jersey.

In June 2025, she won the 400 meters, 800 meters, and 400 meters hurdles at the New Balance Nationals Outdoor in Philadelphia. Her time of 2:00.11 in the 800 meters broke Ajeé Wilson's 2012 state record of 2:00.91, and her time of 51.14 in the 400 meters broke Sydney McLaughlin-Levrone’s 2016 state record of 51.87.

In February 2026, Dumas committed to the University of Arkansas.

== Personal bests ==
Information from World Athletics profile unless otherwise noted.

Outdoor

As of June 24, 2025

Event	Performance	Location	Date	Ref.
100 meters	12.23	Mount Holly	May 3, 2025	
200 meters	24.02	Pennsauken Township	May 17, 2025	
400 meters	51.14	Philadelphia	June 21, 2025	
800 meters	2:00.11	Philadelphia	June 22, 2025	
1600 meters	4:55.66	Allentown	May 23, 2025	
400m hurdles	55.99	Philadelphia	June 20, 2025	

Indoor

As of June 5, 2026

Event	Performance	Location	Date	Ref.
200 meters	24.41	Philadelphia	January 22, 2025	
300 meters	38.11	New York City	February 21, 2026	
400 meters	53.55	Staten Island	March 2, 2025	
600 meters	1:28.10	New York City	February 1, 2026	
800 meters	2:06.75	Virginia Beach	March 21, 2026	

== Personal life ==
Dumas is the younger sister of University of Delaware middle-distance runner Kadence Dumas.
