= List of airlines of Myanmar =

This is a list of airlines currently operating in Myanmar.

== Scheduled airlines ==
Airline	Image	IATA	ICAO	Callsign	Commenced operations	Notes
Mingalar Aviation Services		K7	KBZ	JADE AIR	2010	Domestic
Mann Yadanarpon Airlines		7Y	MYP	MANN ROYAL	2014	Domestic
Myanmar Airways International		8M	MMA	MYANMAR	1998	Domestic and international
Myanmar National Airlines		UB	UBA	UNIONAIR	1948	Domestic and international
Air Thanlwin		ST	RTL	ROYAL BIRD	2019	Domestic

== Charter airlines ==
Airline	Image	IATA	ICAO	Callsign	Commenced operations
Union Express Charter Airline					2014

== See also ==
- Transport in Myanmar
- List of defunct airlines of Myanmar
- List of airports in Myanmar
- List of airlines
