= OOP =

OOP, Oop, or oop may refer to:

== Science and technology ==
- Object-oriented positioning, another name for feature-oriented positioning in microscopy
- Object-oriented programming, a computer programming paradigm
- Order of operations, in mathematics, rules for which parts of an expression are evaluated first
- Out of position (crash testing)

== Others ==
- Order of play, schedule of contests in a tennis event
- Out-of-pocket expenses, in health care, expenses that the insured party must pay directly to the health care provider
- Out of position, in poker a disadvantageous poker position in the order of play
- Out of print, a term referring to a book or other work that is no longer being published
- Oop!, a software idea in Douglas Coupland's novel Microserfs
- Restraining order, also known as an order of protection or OOP

== See also ==
- Alley Oop (disambiguation)
- Objectives Oriented Project Planning, in project management
- OOPP, out-of-process plug-ins in computer software applications
- Oops (disambiguation)
