= Apical =

Apical means "pertaining to an apex". It may refer to:

- Apical ancestor, refers to the last common ancestor of an entire group, such as a species (biology) or a clan (anthropology)
- Apical (anatomy), an anatomical term of location for features located opposite the base of an organism or structure
- Apical (chemistry), a position in certain molecular geometries in chemistry
- Apical (dentistry), direction towards the root tip of a tooth
- Apical consonant, a consonant produced with the tip of the tongue
- Apical dendrite, a type of dendrite found on pyramidal neurons
- Apical dominance, the phenomenon whereby the main, central stem of a plant is dominant over other side stems
- Apical membrane, in cell biology the surface of a plasma membrane that faces inward to the lumen
- Apical meristem, or apex, on a flower

== See also ==
- Apex (disambiguation)
