= Oper =

Oper may refer to:

== Technology ==
- Operator (disambiguation)
  - IRC operator

== Opera ==
- Deutsche Oper Berlin, Oper Leipzig, Komische Oper Berlin, Alte Oper
- Romantische Oper, genre of German opera

== Surname ==
- Andres Oper, Estonian football player

== Mathematics ==
- Oper (mathematics), a mathematical bundle on a punctured disc, equipped with a flat connection and an additional extra structure, called the "oper structure"
