= Alley Oop (disambiguation) =

Alley Oop is a syndicated comic strip and its main character, created by V. T. Hamlin in 1932.

Alley Oop may also refer to:

- Alley Oop, a name shared between two moves; a facebuster and a powerbomb in pro wrestling
- "Alley Oop" (song), written in 1957 by Dallas Frazier
- Alley-oop (basketball), a play in basketball
- Alley-oop (American football), a play in American football
- Alley-oop (skateboarding), a skateboarding trick
- Alley-oop (skating), an inline skating trick

== See also ==
- Allez Oop
- OOP (disambiguation)
