= Winston Schroder =

American decathlete (born 2008)

Personal information
- Nationality: United States
- Born: 2008 (age 17–18)
- Height: 6 ft 0 in (183 cm)
- Weight: 160 lb (73 kg)

Sport
- Sport: Athletics
- Events: Decathlon, Long jump
- Club: Valley Flash Running Club
- Coached by: Shannon Castelda

Achievements and titles
- Personal bests: Decathlon: 7,583 points (High school implements); Pentathlon: 3,507 points (High school implements)

Winston Schroder is an American decathlete who competes for St. James Academy in Springfield, Virginia. He holds the current high school freshman class records in the boys pentathlon (indoor) and the decathlon.

== High school ==
In January 2025, Schroder set the national all-time freshman indoor pentathlon record at the RADD Sunshine Showcase in Gainesville with a score of 3,507 points.

In June 2025, Schroder won the New Balance Nationals outdoor title in the boys decathlon with a score of 7,092 points, beating the previous meet record of 6,961 points set the year prior by decathlete Colton Dean.

He is the first freshman to win the boys decathlon title.

== Personal bests ==
Information from World Athletics profile unless otherwise noted.

Outdoor

As of June 12, 2026

Individual events
Event	Performance	Location	Date	Ref.
110 meters hurdles	15.84 (+1.1 m/s)	Daytona	April 5, 2025	
110 meters hurdles	15.69 (+3.6 m/s)	Austin	April 3, 2026	
Long jump	7.28 m (23 ft 10 1/2 in) (+1.7 m/s)	Austin	April 3, 2026	
Long jump	7.45 m (24 ft 5 1/4 in) (+2.5 m/s)	Austin	April 3, 2026	
High jump	1.67 m (5 ft 5 1/2 in)	Daytona	April 3, 2025	
Pole vault	3.80 m (12 ft 5 1/2 in)	Bradenton	May 10, 2025	
Shot put (4kg)	15.13 m (49 ft 7 1/2 in)	Philadelphia	June 14, 2024	
Discus throw	41.13 m (134 ft 11 1/4 in)	Bradenton	May 9, 2025	
Javelin throw	50.23 m (164 ft 9 1/2 in)	Bradenton	May 10, 2025	

Combined events
Event	Performance	Location	Date	Score	Ref.
Decathlon	—N/a	Bradenton	May 29–30, 2026	7,583 points	—N/a
100 meters	10.87 (+1.2 m/s)	Spokane Valley	July 3, 2025	890 points	
100 meters	10.69 (+4.6 m/s)	Bradenton	May 29, 2026	—N/a	
Long jump	7.58 m (24 ft 10 1/4 in) (+1.6 m/s)	Bradenton	May 29, 2026	955 points	
Shot put (6kg)	14.42 m (47 ft 3 1/2 in)	Bradenton	May 29, 2026	754 points	
High jump	1.80 m (5 ft 10 3/4 in)	Bradenton	May 29, 2026	627 points	
400 meters	49.91	Bradenton	May 29, 2026	819 points	
110m hurdles (99.0cm)	15.25 (+0.0 m/s)	Philadelphia	June 20, 2025	820 points	
110m hurdles (99.0cm)	14.52 (+2.1 m/s)	Bradenton	May 30, 2026	—N/a	
Discus throw (1.500kg)	42.16 m (138 ft 3 3/4 in)	Bradenton	April 11, 2025	709 points	
Pole vault	4.30 m (14 ft 1 1/4 in)	Bradenton	May 30, 2026	702 points	
Javelin throw	52.88 m (173 ft 5 3/4 in)	Bradenton	May 30, 2026	631 points	
1500 meters	4:49.39	Philadelphia	June 20, 2025	622 points	
Virtual Best Performance				7,529 points	—N/a

Indoor

As of June 12, 2026

Individual events
Event	Performance	Location	Date	Ref.
55 meters	6.46	Virginia Beach	January 16, 2026	
55 meters hurdles	7.53	Virginia Beach	January 16, 2026	
60 meters	7.21	Gainesville	February 1, 2025	
Long jump	7.23 m (23 ft 8 1/2 in)	Boston	March 13, 2026	
Pole vault	3.80 m (12 ft 5 1/2 in)	Gainesville	February 1, 2025	
Shot put (5kg)	13.87	Gainesville	February 1, 2025	

Combined events
Event	Performance	Location	Date	Score	Ref.
Pentathlon	—N/a	Gainesville	January 26, 2025	3,507 points	—N/a
60m hurdles (99.0cm)	8.66	Boston	March 14, 2025	823 points	
Long jump	6.63 m (21 ft 9 in)	Gainesville	January 26, 2025	727 points	
Shot put (5kg)	13.63 m (44 ft 8 1/2 in)	Gainesville	January 26, 2025	706 points	
High jump	1.71 m (5 ft 7 1/4 in)	Gainesville	January 26, 2025	552 points	
1000 meters	2:50.08	Gainesville	January 26, 2025	765 points	
Virtual Best Performance				3,573 points	—N/a
