= American International School =

American International School (AIS) may refer to:

- American International School, Abu Dhabi, United Arab Emirates
- American International School of Accra, Ghana
- American International School of Algiers, Algeria
- American International School of Bamako, Mali
- American International School of Bucharest, Romania
- American International School of Cape Town, South Africa
- American International School Chennai, India
- American International School of Costa Rica
- American International School of Dhaka, Bangladesh
- American International School in Gaza, Palestine
- American International School of Guangzhou, China
- American International School Hong Kong
- American International School of Johannesburg, South Africa
- American International School of Kuwait
- American International School of Libreville, Gabon
- American International School – Riyadh, Saudi Arabia
- American International School, Saigon, Vietnam
- American International School of Sydney, Australia
- American International School Vienna, Austria
- American International School of Zagreb, Croatia
- American International School of Zurich, Switzerland
- Walworth Barbour American International School in Israel

== See also ==
- American School (disambiguation)
