= Cooperative Bank of Tarlac =

The Cooperative Bank of Tarlac (CBT) is a cooperative bank in the Philippines, operating out of the province of Tarlac. Its main base is Tarlac City, with branches in Paniqui, Concepcion, Capas and Camiling. The bank, formerly the Cooperative Rural Bank of Tarlac, was established in 1977 following the merger of 108 cooperatives, and samahang nayons in the province into one financial institution. It provides banking services not only to the residents of Tarlac and its farmers in particular, but also to cooperatives that likewise operate in the province.

In 2009, the provincial government of Tarlac was commended by President Gloria Macapagal Arroyo for providing the level of assistance that it did to the bank, which was unmatched by any other local government unit.

On 24 October 2014, the Monetary Board made a resolution prohibiting the bank from continuing its business. It was then put under the receivership of the state-run PDIC.
