= Majuro Cooperative School =

Location
- Majuro; Marshall Islands
- Coordinates: 7°05′28″N 171°23′00″E

Information
- Type: K-12 school
- Website: majurocoopschool.wordpress.com

Majuro Cooperative International School (Co-op) is a PreK-12, non-religious private school in Majuro, Marshall Islands. The school is located in the southeastern part of Majuro.

It was established in 1975.

The Marshall Islands Journal stated in 2015 that the school " is the most consistent" in the placement tests of the College of the Marshall Islands (CMI). In 2014 22 students took the CMI English placement test with 27% achieving the credit level, the second highest percentage of any high school in the Marshall Islands.

Western Association of Schools and Colleges accredits the school. It was re-accredited by the WASC in 2016 and this is to run through 2022.
