= Co-Operative, Kentucky =

Unincorporated community in Kentucky, United States

- Unincorporated community
- Location within Kentucky Location within the United States
- Coordinates: 36°41′34″N 84°36′28″W
- Country: United States
- State: Kentucky
- County: McCreary
- Elevation: 873 ft (266 m)
- Time zone: UTC-6 (Central (CST))
  - Summer (DST): UTC-5 (CST)
- GNIS feature ID: 511429

Co-Operative is an unincorporated community and coal town in McCreary County, Kentucky, United States. Their post office closed in 1984.

Co-Operative has been noted for its unusual place name.
