= Nepal Co-operative Party =

Nepal Co-operative Party नेपाल को-अपरेटिभ पार्टी
- President: Toyanath Dahal

Election symbol

The Nepal Co-operative Party (Nepali: नेपाल को-अपरेटिभ पार्टी) is a political party in Nepal. The party registered with the Election Commission of Nepal ahead of the 2008 Constituent Assembly election. The party supports the formation of rural cooperatives.
