= Orthogonal polarization spectral imaging =

Blood vessel imaging technique

- Purpose: imaging small blood vessels

Orthogonal polarization spectral imaging (OPS imaging) is a method for imaging small blood vessels in tissue like the nail bed or lip.

It uses a light source of linearly polarized light with a wavelength of 550 nanometers, an isosbestic point for hemoglobin, thus imaging the erythrocytes as they are flowing through the small blood vessels. The reflected light orthogonal (at a 90° angle) to the emitted light is recorded, thus eliminating direct reflections. The depolarized light forms an image of the microcirculation on a charge-coupled device (CCD), which can be captured through single frames or on videotape. The image produced is as if the light source is actually placed behind the desired target or transilluminated.

It has been validated, even under low hematocrit circumstances.
