= Contingent cooperator =

In game theory, a contingent cooperator is a person or agent who is willing to act in the collective interest, rather than his short-term selfish interest, if he observes a majority of the other agents in the collective doing the same. The apparent contradiction in this stance is resolved by game theory, which shows that in the right circumstances, cooperation with a sufficient number of other participants will have a better outcome for cooperators than pursuing short-term selfish interests.

== See also ==
- Cooperation
- Iterated prisoner's dilemma
- Tit for tat
