= Apex Park and Recreation District =

Park and recreation district in Colorado, USA

Coordinates: 39°49′33″N 105°08′45″W

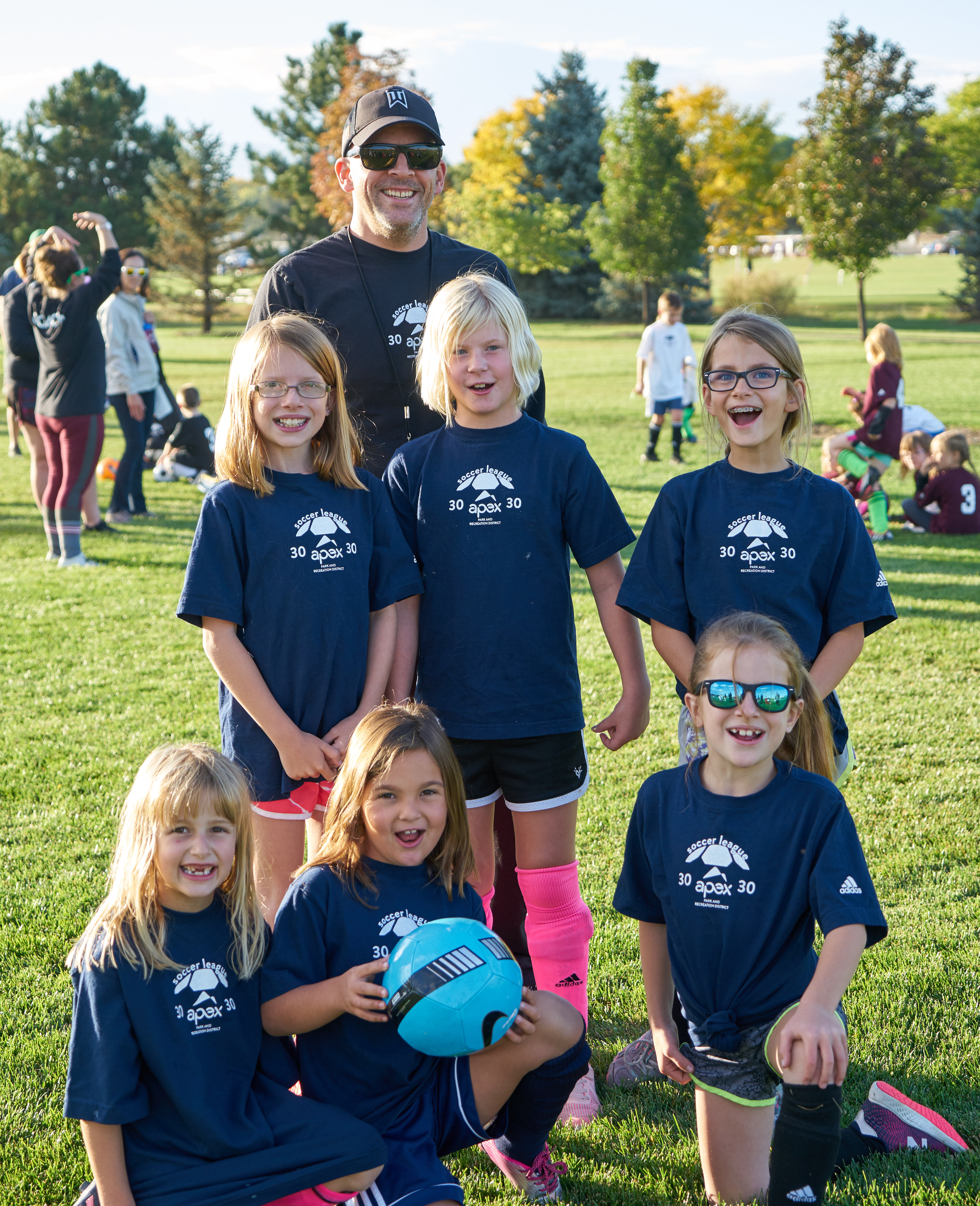
Soccer at Apex.

The Apex Park and Recreation District is a park and recreation district located in the northeastern portion of Jefferson County, Colorado, United States. Apex encompasses the portion of City of Arvada and adjacent areas that are located within Jefferson County. The district serves a population of more than 100,000. The district is a resource for all types of athletic activities, events, classes, and family entertainment for those who live in the encompassing neighborhoods, as well as visitors from across the metro area and beyond. With a few exceptions, the Apex Park and Recreation District boundaries are Sheridan Boulevard on the east, Clear Creek and 52nd Avenue on the south, Highway 93 on the west and the Boulder/Broomfield county line on the north.

Apex Park and Recreation District is managed by an executive director and a five-member elected board of directors. Directors serve four-year terms with elections held every two years in May.

While the Apex Park and Recreation District works collaboratively with other entities, it is a separate agency not connected to other government agencies.
