= Union Express Charter Airline =

Myanma airline

Union Express is a charter airline based in Myanmar.

== History ==
In May 2014 (12 years ago), Union Express Charter Airline was announced as a start-up airline to offer charter flights from its hub at Myeik, Myanmar (Myeik Airport) to Bangkok (Suvarnabhumi Airport) using a Boeing 737 Next Generation aircraft on twice weekly flights from mid-2014. The airline also offers cargo charter services.

It is a joint venture between Myanmar Union Express Aviation Group and Myeik Public Corporation.
