= Eastern Regional High School =

High school in Camden County, New Jersey, US

Location
- 1401 Laurel Oak Road; Voorhees Township, Camden County, New Jersey 08043; United States; 39.8497°N 74.9667°W

Information
- Type: Public high school
- Established: 1965
- School district: Eastern Camden County Regional High School District
- NCES School ID: 340438001488
- Principal: Steve Lee
- Faculty: 141.8 FTEs
- Grades: 9-12
- Enrollment: 1,847 (as of 2024–25)
- Student to teacher ratio: 13.0:1
- Colors: Cardinal and Navy Blue
- Athletics conference: Olympic Conference (general); West Jersey Football League (football)
- Team name: Vikings
- Newspaper: The Voyager
- Website: www.eccrsd.us

Eastern Regional High School is a four-year comprehensive public high school for students in ninth through twelfth grades from Berlin Borough, Gibbsboro and Voorhees Township, three communities in Camden County, in the U.S. state of New Jersey, operating as part of the Eastern Camden County Regional High School District. The high school is located in Voorhees Township.

As of the 2024–25 school year, the school had an enrollment of 1,847 students and 141.8 classroom teachers (on an FTE basis), for a student–teacher ratio of 13.0:1. There were 280 students (15.2% of enrollment) eligible for free lunch and 21 (1.1% of students) eligible for reduced-cost lunch.

== History ==
The origin of the district dates to 1964, when voters in all three sending communities approved a referendum to fund the construction of a high school.

The original school building with 18 classrooms was constructed on a site covering 50 acres (20 ha) at a cost of $1.7 million (equivalent to $28.7 million in 2025). Prior to opening, students from Berlin Borough attended Edgewood Regional High School, while those from Gibbsboro and Voorhees Township were sent to either Collingswood High School or Haddonfield Memorial High School.

The school opened in 1965, with 35 professional staff and 525 students in grades 9-11 in a building designed to accommodate an enrollment of 850. The school was originally divided into schools on the same site: Eastern Intermediate High School (grades 9-10), completed in 1992, and Eastern Senior High School (grades 11-12). There were over 1,000 students enrolled at Eastern Senior High School. Eastern Intermediate High School had approximately 1,150 enrolled students. In September 2012, the schools merged into one unit with the retirement of Dr. James Talarico in June 2012 and was renamed "Eastern Regional High School" with Robert Tull serving as the principal of the merged school. The oldest parts of the school, which were constructed in 1965, 1970, and 1975 are now the "11-12 Building", and the 1992 addition is referred to as the "9-10 Building".

In 2021, the school and its principal were accused of attempting to censor the valedictorian's speech during the graduation ceremony. Bryce Dershem, the valedictorian, gave a speech that included him being queer and overcoming mental health issues, but the principal, Robert Tull, tried to make him recite a preapproved speech that excluded those remarks.

== Awards, recognition and rankings ==
Eastern Regional High School was ranked 81st out of 337 High Schools statewide in New Jersey Monthly magazine's September 2016 cover story on the state's "Top Public High Schools" using a new ranking methodology. The school was the 104th-ranked public high school in New Jersey out of 339 schools statewide in New Jersey Monthly magazine's September 2014 cover story on the state's "Top Public High Schools", using a new ranking methodology. The school had been ranked 117th in the state of 328 schools in 2012, after being ranked 86th in 2010 out of 322 schools listed. The magazine ranked the school 79th in 2008 out of 316 schools.

Schooldigger.com ranked the school tied for 133rd out of 381 public high schools statewide in its 2011 rankings (a decrease of 46 positions from the 2010 ranking) which were based on the combined percentage of students classified as proficient or above proficient on the mathematics (86.0%) and language arts literacy (93.1%) components of the High School Proficiency Assessment (HSPA).

In its 2013 report on "America's Best High Schools", The Daily Beast ranked the school 847th in the nation among participating public high schools and 63rd among schools in New Jersey.

== Sports ==
The Eastern High School Vikings participate in the Olympic Conference, which is comprised of public and private high schools in Burlington and Camden counties, and operates under the auspices of the New Jersey State Interscholastic Athletic Association. With 1,486 students in grades 10–12, the school was classified by the NJSIAA for the 2019–20 school year as Group IV for most athletic competition purposes, which included schools with an enrollment of 1,060 to 5,049 students in that grade range. The football team competes in the Memorial Division of the 94-team West Jersey Football League superconference and was classified by the NJSIAA as Group V South for football for 2024–2026, which included schools with 1,333 to 2,324 students.

Eastern High School has an ice hockey club that fields both a varsity and junior varsity teams. In the 2015–16 season, the team beat Kingsway Regional High School in a series of 2–1 to claim the SJHSHL Tier 1-B Championship on a goal scored seven seconds into overtime. The team, which is a member of the South Jersey High School Ice Hockey League, competes against other member high schools throughout South Jersey.

The wrestling team won the South Jersey Group III state sectional championships in 1983 and 1985

The softball team won the Group IV state championship in 1986 (against finalist Ridgewood High School) and 2012 (vs. Hunterdon Central Regional High School). The 1986 team finished the season with a 22-4 record after winning the Group IV title with 2-1 victory against Ridgewood in the championship game at Trenton State College. The team won the 2012 Group IV title with a 2–0 win in the finals against returning champion Hunterdon Central.

The 1989 boys' basketball team won the Group III state championships, defeating runner-up Sparta High School by a score of 73-63 in the finals played at Fairleigh Dickinson University's Rothman Center and came into the inaugural Tournament of Champions as the sixth seed, defeating third-seeded Haddonfield Memorial High School by a score of 56-54 in the quarterfinals before falling in the semis by 82-58 to number-two seed Elizabeth High School to finish the season with a record of 28-6.

The boys cross country team won the Group IV state championship in 1993.

The girls' volleyball team won the Group IV state championship in 2001, defeating Hunterdon Central Regional High School by 15-7 and 15–11, after losing to Hackensack High School in the Group IV final in 2000.

The boys' bowling team won the overall state championship in 2001.

The girls team won the NJSIAA spring / outdoor track state championship in Group IV in 2002 and 2003.

The football team won the NJSIAA South Jersey Group IV state sectional championship in 2003. Eastern won the 2003 South Jersey, Group IV title with a 14–7 win against Washington Township High School and competed in the playoffs six out of eight years after winning their first state sectional title.

The girls' varsity soccer team won back-to-back Group IV state championships in 2005 (vs. Roxbury High School in the finals) and 2006 (vs. North Hunterdon High School). In 2005, they won the Group IV South sectional championship over Toms River High School East 1–0. The team then went on to win the state championship game by a score of 2–0 over Roxbury High School. The team repeated in 2006, defeating Washington Township High School 2–0 in the Group IV South sectional championship, and defeating North Hunterdon High School to capture the 2006 Group IV state championship.

The baseball team won the Group IV state title in 2013 over runner-up Westfield High School. The team finished the season with a record of 30–4, winning the 2013 Group IV title with an 8–1 win against Westfield in the tournament's championship game.

In June 2025, junior Natalie Dumas set the record for the 400 meters with a time of 51.14 at the New Balance Nationals Outdoor high school track and field meet, breaking the state record that she had shared with Olympian Sydney McLaughlin-Levrone.

=== Field hockey team ===
Eastern's field hockey team has the longest consecutive unbeaten streak in the history of the National Federation.

The team won the Group III state championship in 1979, 1990, 1999–2019 and 2021. The program's 24 state titles and the 21 consecutive titles from 1999 to 2019 are the most of any school in the state. After winning the inaugural field hockey Tournament of Champions in 2006 against runner-up West Essex High School, the team repeated as ToC champion in 2008 (vs. Wall Township High School), 2009 (vs. Shore Regional High School), 2011 (vs. West Essex), 2013-2015 (vs. Oak Knoll School of the Holy Child in the three consecutive finals) and 2018 (vs. Oak Knoll). Eastern won the Tournament of Champions in nine of the 14 times that it was played.

The 2000 team won the Group IV state title with a 5-0 win against Morris Knolls in the finals at The College of New Jersey to finish at 23-0 in a season in which the team allowed four goals all year long.

The 2003 team won the Group IV state championship with a 1–0 win over Lenape High School in the semifinals and a 6–0 win against Hunterdon Central High School in the tournament's final match. The 2004 team repeated as Group IV champion, again defeating Hunterdon Central High School in the tournament final. In 2006, Eastern's field hockey team won the Tournament of Champions, defeating West Essex High School by a score of 2–1. In 2007, the field hockey team won the South Jersey, Group IV state sectional championship in commanding fashion with a 10–0 win over Atlantic City High School in the quarterfinals, 8–0 over Cherokee High School in the semis and an 8–0 win over Washington Township High School in the tournament final. The team moved on to win the Group IV state championship with a 10–0 win over Steinert High School in the semis and a 4–0 win against Bridgewater-Raritan High School in the finals. With this win, the team had won nine consecutive Group IV state titles, tying a national record. The team would go on to sweep Group IV and Tournament of Champions titles in 2008 and 2009. The Vikings are one of only two teams to ever score more than 200 goals in a season.

Eastern's dominance against New Jersey opponents finally came to an end on November 14, 2007, when they lost to Group I Oak Knoll 3–2 in overtime of the Tournament of Champions semifinals. Dating back to 1998, the team had won 208 consecutive games against opponents from New Jersey, but still holds the national record unbeaten streak of 153 games. In all the school years between 2011 and 2015, the Eastern field hockey team was ranked number one in the nation.

This 'Field Hockey Dynasty' was noted in an article in the Sunday edition of The New York Times, including profiles of team members. In 2013, the field-hockey program received a Special Achievement Award from the Philadelphia Sports Writers Association, in recognition of its 14 consecutive New Jersey state field hockey championships and its 2013 victory in the state Tournament of Champions.

Coach Danyle Heilig retired in 2020, finishing her 21-year career coaching the team with an overall record of 527-16-10, winning 21 Group IV state championships (every year she coached the team), 13 Tournament of Champions titles and nine national number one rankings.

== Extracurricular activities ==
Eastern High School has run a successful Model United Nations team and program. In 2001, the South Jersey Model UN Consortium was started by the former advisor, Janet E. Rabin. The program runs the South Jersey Model United Nations one-day conference every fall and visits college conferences in the fall and spring. The Model UN team has won such awards as Best Small and Large Delegation at Rutgers Model UN, Best Small Delegation at Harvard Model United Nations, in addition to others. The Model UN team has attended conferences at Georgetown University, Johns Hopkins University, Rutgers University, and Harvard University, consistently winning awards at all of these prestigious schools. The program was recently ranked the 21st best High School Model UN team in the country. The Model Congress team has also had much success at Rutgers Model Congress.

The school's marching band was Tournament of Bands Chapter One Champions in 1976 and 1981 (Group 1), and State Champions in 2011, 2012, and 2014. (Group 2). The marching band was 1981 and 2012 Atlantic Coast Champions in Group 1 and 2014 Atlantic Coast Champions in Group 2. In 2023, they went undefeated and won Atlantic Coast Championships with a score of 98.0 with their show “Shattered”. They also won Atlantic Coast Championships in 2024 as well. They are also six years in a row state champions from 2019-2024.

Eastern conducts an award-winning theater program that includes an NJDFL Team Theatre (New Jersey State Champions 2008-09 and 2nd Place finishers in both 2011-12 and 2012–13), annual Fall Play and Spring Musical, and One-Acts Festival. Eastern's 2010 musical, Chicago, earned Sarah Cheatham a Paper Mill Playhouse Rising Star nomination for her lead performance as 'Roxie.' Eastern's 2011 musical, Cats, earned the award for Outstanding High School Musical in the 8-county Philadelphia region by the Greater Philadelphia Cappies, as well as both Best Actor and Best Actress in a Musical. In 2012, for the second consecutive year, an Eastern musical was nominated for 'Outstanding Production' in New Jersey by the Rising Star Awards sponsored by the State Theatre of New Jersey, Paper Mill Playhouse.

In 2023, Eastern's theatre department won exclusive rights in New Jersey to perform Frozen as performed on Broadway. This was a result of the "United States of Frozen" competition, which granted one high school in each state the materials to perform the show for the very first time.

== Administration ==
The school's principal is Steve Lee. His administration team includes the seven vice principals.

== Notable alumni ==
- Amirah Ali (born 1998), soccer forward and midfielder who plays for San Diego Wave FC of the National Women's Soccer League
- Eli Apple (born 1994, class of 2013), defensive back for the San Francisco 49ers
- Braille (born 1981 as Bryan Winchester), hip-hop recording artist
- Chris Canty (born 1976), American football player who played in the NFL for the New England Patriots, Seattle Seahawks and New Orleans Saints
- Rachel Dawson (born 1985), Olympic field hockey midfielder
- Sarah Dawson (born 1982), field hockey forward / midfielder
- Natalie Dumas (born 2008), runner who specializes in the 400 meters
- Tom Flacco (born 1994), quarterback for the Saskatchewan Roughriders of the Canadian Football League
- English Gardner (born 1992, class of 2010), track and field sprinter who specializes in the 100-meter dash
- Dana Hall (born 1969), jazz musician.
- Jack Landau (born 1953), attorney and jurist in the state of Oregon
- Kelli McGroarty (born 2001), professional soccer player who plays as a forward for A-League Women club Melbourne City
- Leonard Neidorf (born c. 1988, class of 2006), philologist who specializes in the study of Old English and Middle English literature, and is a known authority on Beowulf
- Kelly Ripa (born 1970), host of Live! with Kelly (formerly co-host with Regis Philbin) and co-star with Faith Ford in Hope & Faith
- Logan Ryan (born 1991), NFL cornerback with the Tennessee Titans
- Davis Schneider (born 1999, class of 2017), professional baseball infielder and outfielder for the Toronto Blue Jays
- Adam Taliaferro (born 1982), former Penn State Football player who overcame paralysis, and subject of the book Miracle in the Making
- Madison Tiernan (born 1995), soccer midfielder who plays for Sky Blue FC of National Women's Soccer League
- Riley Tiernan (born 2002), soccer forward who has played for Angel City FC of the National Women's Soccer League
- Phil Trautwein (born 1986), former NFL offensive tackle who played for the St. Louis Rams
- Julia Udine (born 1993), actress who performed as Christine on Broadway and the North American tour of The Phantom of the Opera
- Toyelle Wilson (born 1981), Prairie View A&M Panthers women's basketball head coach, three-time SWAC Division I women's basketball champion
- Brandon Wynn (born 1988), artistic gymnast who was a member of the United States men's national artistic gymnastics team
