= Operation =

Operation or Operations may refer to:

== Arts, entertainment and media ==
- Operation (game), a battery-operated board game that challenges dexterity
- Operation (music), a term used in musical set theory
- Operations (magazine), Multi-Man Publishing's house organ for articles and discussion about its wargaming products
- The Operation (film), a 1973 British television film
- The Operation (1990), a crime, drama, TV movie starring Joe Penny, Lisa Hartman, and Jason Beghe
- The Operation M.D., formerly The Operation, a Canadian garage rock band
- "Operation", a song by Relient K from The Creepy EP, 2001

=== Television ===
==== Episodes ====
- "The Operation", Sky Dancers episode 27 (1996)
- "The Operation", The Golden Girls season 1, episode 18 (1986)
- "The Operation", You're Only Young Twice (1997) series 2, episode 8 (1978)

==== Shows ====
- The Operation (1992–1998), a reality television series from TLC

== Business ==
- Manufacturing operations, operation of a facility
- Operations management, an area of management concerned with designing and controlling the process of production

== Military and law enforcement ==
- Military operation, a military action (usually in a military campaign) using deployed forces
  - Black operation, or "Black op", an operation that may be outside of standard military protocol or against the law
  - Clandestine operation, an intelligence or military operation carried out so that the operation goes unnoticed
  - Combined operations, operations by forces of two or more allied nations
  - Covert operation, an operation which conceals the identity of the sponsor
  - Psychological operations, an operation consisting of psychological manipulations, tactics, and warfare
  - Special operations, military operations that are unconventional
- Operations (J3), third level of Nation Level Command Structure
- Operations (military staff), staff involved in planning operations
- Sting operation, an operation designed to catch a person committing a crime, by means of deception

== Science and technology ==
- Inference, a step in reasoning
- Information technology operations
- Operation (mathematics), a calculation from zero or more input values (called operands) to an output value
  - Arity, number of arguments or operands that the function takes
  - Binary operation, calculation that combines two elements of the set to produce another element of the set
  - Graph operations, produce new graphs from initial ones
  - Modulo operation, operation finds the remainder after division of one number by another
  - Operations research, in British usage, application of advanced analytical methods to make better decisions
  - Unary operation, an operation with only one operand
- Rail transport operations, the control of a rail system
- Scientific operation
- Surgical operation, or surgery, in medicine
- Unit operation, a basic step in a chemical engineering process

== Other uses ==
- Anomalous operation, in parapsychology, a term describing a broad category of purported paranormal effects
- Operation, a word which represents a grammatical relation (i.e., function) or instruction, rather than a term or name
- Operation of law, a legal term that indicates that a right or liability has been created for a party

== See also ==
- List of military operations
- OP (disambiguation)
- Operations support system, used in the telecommunications industry
- Operations room, the tactical center providing processed information for command and control of an area of operations
- Operative (disambiguation)
- Operator (disambiguation)
