= Co-operative Insurance Cup =

Co-operative Insurance Cup may refer to:

- Scottish League Cup (2008–11)
- Irish League Cup (2001–11)
