= People's Co-op Building =

- U.S. National Register of Historic Places
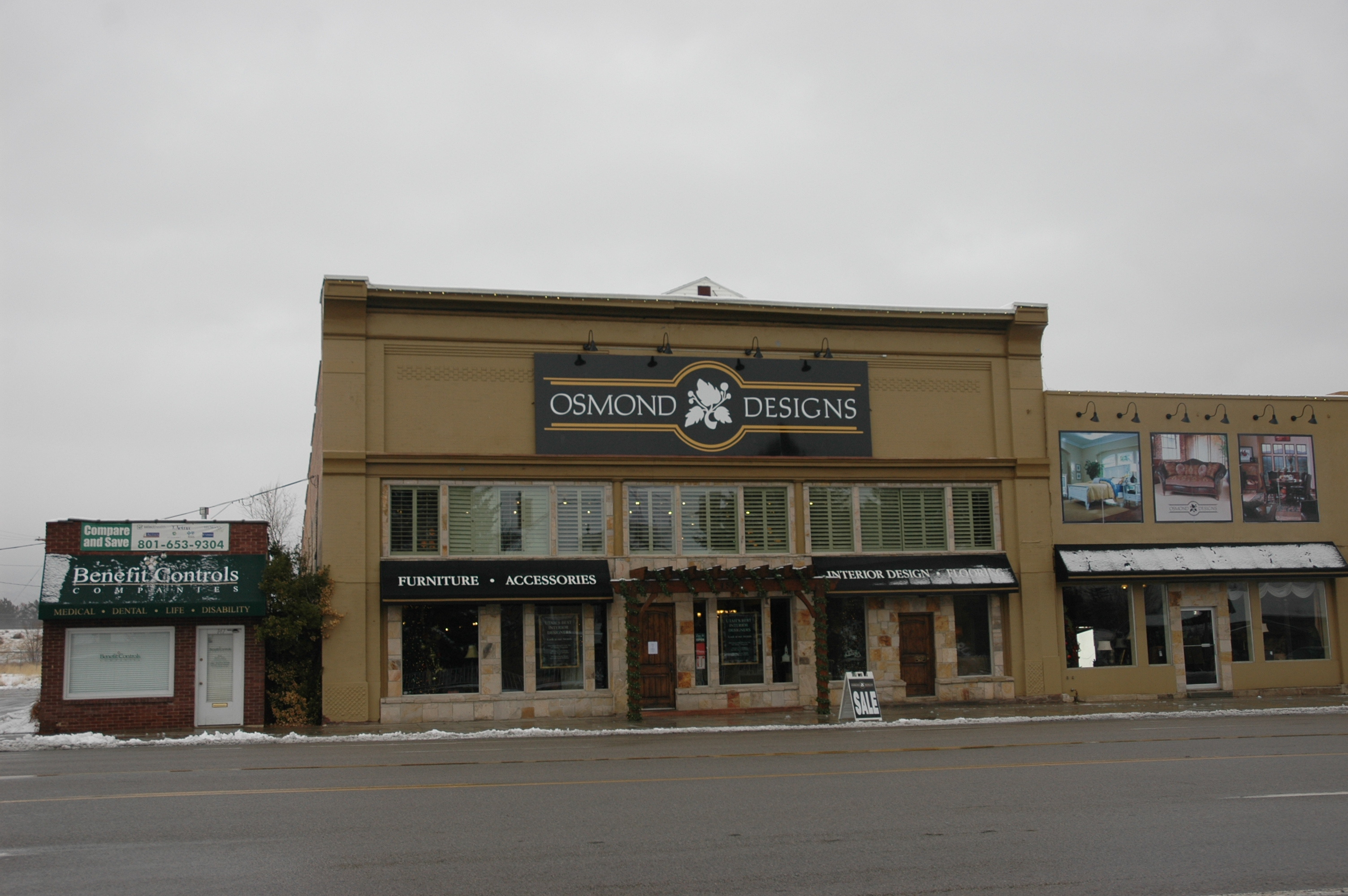

- Location within Utah Location within the United States
- Location: 151 E. State St., Lehi, Utah
- Coordinates: 40°23′50″N 111°50′47″W
- Area: 0.5 acres (0.20 ha)
- Built: 1902–03
- Built by: Ohran, Charles; Fjeld, Andrew
- Architectural style: Late Victorian
- MPS: Lehi, Utah MPS
- NRHP reference No.: 98001457
- Added to NRHP: December 4, 1998

The People's Co-op Building at 151 E. State St. in Lehi, Utah was built during 1902–03. It was listed on the National Register of Historic Places in 1998. It has also been known as Niagara Skating Rink, Lehi Roller Skating Rink, Grass Furniture, and Christensen Wholesale.

It was the first building in Lehi to have a cement sidewalk, and it was one of the first in Lehi to have electricity. It was one of several buildings in a complex serving the People's Cooperative Mercantile Institution, which had been located on the site since 1872. The building was built on the site of a former building for furnaces, stoves, and agricultural implements; it was built adjacent to an 1878 building which had served as the mercantile building previously. The building had 22,000 square feet (0.20 ha) of mercantile and warehouse space. It is built with brick walls on an ashlar foundation, and possibly was built by local brick masons Andrew Fjeld and Charles Ohran. The building was modified in c.1960 to add an "aluminum 'storefront' glass wall" on the ground level.
