= Co-operative University =

Co-operative University or similar, may refer to:

- Co-operative University, Sagaing, Sagaing, Sagaing, Myanmar
- Co-operative University, Thanlyin, Thanlyin, Yangon, Myanmar
- Cooperative University of Colombia, Colombia
- Moshi Co-operative University, Moshi, Tanzania
- The Co-operative University of Kenya, Nairobi, Kenya; see List of universities and colleges in Kenya
- Independent Cooperative University, France; see List of universities and colleges in France

== See also ==
- Cooperativeness
- Cooperative
- Co-operative College, a British school charity
- cooperative learning
- co-operative education
- co-operative studies
- Cooperative School (disambiguation) (disambiguation)
