= Apex (band) =

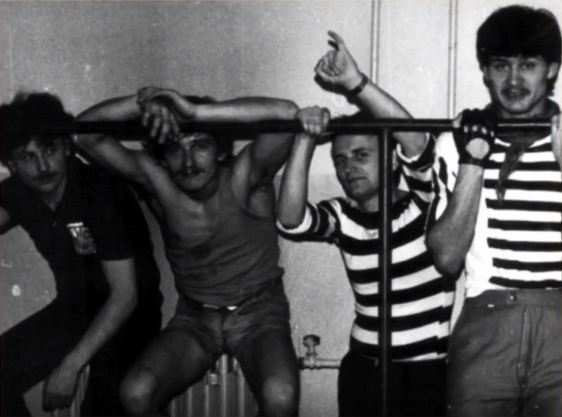
- Apex in 1986.

Background information
- Origin: Prudnik, Poland
- Genres: Progressive rock, hard rock, heavy metal
- Years active: 1980–1988
- Label: Polskie Radio Opole
- Past members: Grzegorz Panek; Mariusz Lewicz; Ireneusz Raczyk; Zbigniew Towarnicki; Krzysztof Robotycki; Józef Kotyś; Norbert Mletzko; Zbigniew Ociepka

Apex was a Polish heavy metal, hard rock and progressive rock band. It was started in 1980, in Prudnik.

== History ==
The band was formed in 1980 in Prudnik. It performed mostly hard rock songs and ballads. It was considered to be one of the best rock bands in Opole Voivodeship. In 1986 the band won the Polskie Radio Program III eliminations to the "Śpiewajmy Poezję" contest in Olsztyn. In 1987 the band performed at the Drrrama festival in Pruszcz Gdański. It was dissolved in 1988.

== Personnel ==
=== Final lineup ===
- Grzegorz Panek – vocals (1986–1988)
- Mariusz Lewicz – guitar (1980–1988)
- Ireneusz Raczyk – guitar (1986–1988)
- Zbigniew Towarnicki – bass guitar (1986–1988)
- Krzysztof Robotycki – drums (1986–1988)

=== Former members ===
- Joachim Stosiek – bass guitar (1980-1986)
- Józef Kotyś – vocals (1980–1986)
- Norbert Mletzko – guitar (1980–1986)
- Zbigniew Ociepka – drums (1980–1986)
