= Cooperative game =

Cooperative game may refer to:

- Cooperative board game, board games in which players work together to achieve a common goal
- Cooperative game theory, in game theory, a game with competition between groups of players and the possibility of cooperative behavior
- Cooperative video game, a video game that allows players to work together as teammates
