= SS Empire Carpenter =

World War II merchant ship of the United Kingdom

History
- Name: Empire Carpenter (1942-44); Dickson (1944-46); Empire Carpenter (1946-47 ); Petfrano (1947-55); Amipa (1955-58); Apex (1958-68); Afros (1968-71)
- Owner: Ministry of War Transport (1942-45); Ministry of Transport (1945-47); Petrinovic Steamship Co Ltd (1947-55); Compagnia di Navigazione Amipa SA (1955-58); Compagnia Maritime Apex SA (1958-70); Campos Shipping Co (1970-71)
- Operator: Hain Steamship Co Ltd (1943-44); Soviet Union (1944-46); Petrinovic Steamship Co Ltd (1946-55); Compagnia di Navigazione Amipa SA (1955-58); Compagnia Maritime Apex SA (1958-70); Campos Shipping Co (1970-71)
- Port of registry: (United Kingdom) London (1943-44); Soviet Union (1944-46); (United Kingdom) London (1946-55); Panama City (1955-70); (Liberia) Monrovia (1970-71)
- Builder: C Connell & Co Ltd
- Yard number: 440
- Launched: 21 November 1942
- Completed: January 1943
- Identification: Code Letters BFLJ (1943-44); Official Number 168745 (1942-44, 1946-55)
- Fate: Scrapped 1971.

General characteristics
- Tonnage: 7,025 GRT; 4,857 NRT; 10,318DWT
- Length: 431 ft 3 in (131.45 m)
- Beam: 56 ft 2 in (17.12 m)
- Draught: 27 ft 3 in (8.31 m)
- Depth: 33 ft 6 in (10.21 m)
- Installed power: Triple expansion steam engine
- Propulsion: Screw propeller

Empire Carpenter was a 7,025 GRT cargo ship which was built in 1942 for the Ministry of War Transport (MoWT). In 1944 she was leased to the Soviet Union and renamed Dickson. In 1946, she was returned to the United Kingdom and regained her former name of Empire Carpenter. She was sold in 1947 and renamed Petfrano. In 1955, she was sold to Panama owners and renamed Amipa, further sales saw her renamed Apex. In 1968, she was sold to Cypriot owners and renamed Afros, serving until scrapped in 1971.

== Description ==
The ship was built by C Connell & Co Ltd, Scotstoun, as yard number 440. She was launched on 21 November 1942, and completed in January 1943.

The ship was 431 feet 3 inches (131.45 m) long, with a beam of 56 feet 2 inches (17.12 m), a depth of 33 feet 6 inches (10.21 m), and a draught of 27 feet 3 inches (8.31 m). Her GRT was 7,025, with a NRT of 4,857. Her DWT was 10,318.

She was propelled by a triple expansion steam engine, which had cylinders of 24 1/2 inches (62 cm), 39 inches (99 cm) and 70 inches (180 cm) diameter and 48 inches (120 cm) stroke. The engine was built by D Rowan & Co Ltd, Glasgow.

== History ==
Empire Carpenter was built for the MoWT. The United Kingdom Official Number 168745 and the Code Letters BFLJ were allocated. She was placed under the management of the Hain Steamship Co Ltd.

Empire Carpenter was a member of a number of convoys during the Second World War.

NKS9

Convoy MKS departed Bône, Algeria on 4 March 1943 and arrived at Liverpool on 18 March. Empire Caribou was carrying a cargo of steel bound for London.

JW 54A

Convoy JW 54A departed Loch Ewe on 15 November 1943 and arrived at the Kola Inlet on 24 November. Empire Carpenter was carrying the Vice Commodore of the convoy.

JW 57

Convoy JW 57 departed Liverpool on 20 February 1944 and arrived at the Kola Inlet on 28 February.

RA 55A

Convoy RA 55A departed the Kola Inlet on 23 December 1943 and arrived at Loch Ewe on 1 January 1944.

In 1944, Empire Carpenter was transferred to the Soviet Union under Lend-Lease and was renamed Dickson. She was returned to the United Kingdom in 1946 and regained her former name of Empire Carpenter. She was placed under the management of the Petrinovic Steamship Co Ltd.

In 1947, Empire Carpenter was sold to the Petrinovic Steamship Co Ltd and was renamed Petfrano. She served until 1955 when she was sold to Compagnia di Navigazione Amipa SA, Panama and was renamed Amipa. In 1958, she was sold to Compagnia Maritime Apex SA and renamed Apex. In 1968, she was renamed Afros. In 1970, she was sold to Campos Shipping Co, Cyprus. She was reflagged to Liberia, with her port of registry being Monrovia. She served until 1971, arriving for scrapping on 17 March at Shanghai, China.
