= The Operators =

The Operators may refer to:

- The Operators (band), a British indie rock band
- The Operators (book), a 2012 non-fiction book by Michael Hastings
- The Operators (film), or War Machine, a 2017 film based on the book
