= Opp (newspaper) =

Norwegian newspaper

- Type: Local
- Format: Tabloid and online
- Founded: 2002
- Language: Norwegian
- City: Oppdal
- Country: Norway
- Circulation: 2,308 (as of 2013)
- Website: opp.no

Opp is a local online and print newspaper published in Oppdal Municipality, Norway. Published in tabloid format, the newspaper had a circulation of 2,308 in 2013. The newspaper is independently owned. It has one weekly issues, on Thursdays. The newspaper was founded in 2002 and competes with Opdalingen.
