= Operator =

Operator or The Operator may refer to:

== Mathematics ==
- A symbol indicating a mathematical operation
- Logical operator or logical connective in mathematical logic
- Operator (mathematics), mapping that acts on elements of a space to produce elements of another space, e.g.:
  - Linear operator
  - Differential operator
  - Integral operator (disambiguation)
  - Operational calculus

== Computers ==
- Computer operator, an occupation
- Operator (computer programming), a type of computer program function
- Operator (extension), an extension for the Firefox web browser, for reading microformats
- Operator pattern, a provisioning automation and auto-scaling strategy for Kubernetes
- Ableton Operator, a software synthesizer developed by Ableton

== Science ==
- Operator (biology), a segment of DNA regulating the activity of genes
- Operator (linguistics), a special category including wh- interrogatives
- Operator (physics), mathematical operators in quantum physics

== Music ==
- Operator (band), an American hard rock band
- Operators, a synth pop band led by Dan Boeckner
- Operator (album), a 2016 album by Mstrkrft
- "Operator" (Motown song), a 1965 song recorded by Mary Wells and Brenda Holloway
- "Operator" (That's Not the Way It Feels), a 1972 song by Jim Croce from You Don't Mess Around with Jim
- "Operator" (Midnight Star song) (1984), a 1984 #1 R&B/electronic dance single
- "Operator" (A Girl Like Me), a 2008 song by Shiloh
- "Operator", a 1970 song by the Grateful Dead from American Beauty
- "Operator", a 1975 song by the Manhattan Transfer from The Manhattan Transfer
- "Operator", a 1986 song by Little Richard from Lifetime Friend
- "Operator", a 1993 song by Blue System from Backstreet Dreams
- "Operator", a 1995 song by Real McCoy from Another Night
- "Operator", a 1998 song by Miss Papaya from Pink
- "Operator" (Floy Joy song), a song by British group Floy Joy

== Fiction ==
- Operator No. 5, a pulp fiction hero from the 1930s
- Operator, a fictional group in the Ghost in the Shell series
- Operator (2015 film), a 2015 American action thriller drama film starring Luke Goss
- Operator (2016 film), a 2016 American comedy-drama film starring Martin Starr and Mae Whitman
- The Operator (film), a 2000 film
- The Operator, an entity based on the Slender Man that serves as the primary antagonist of Marble Hornets
- Operator (play), a 2005 play by David Williamson
- The Operator (video game), a 2024 video game

== Duties ==
- Operator (profession), a professional designation used in various industries, e.g.:
  - Switchboard operator, an occupation at a company offering telephone services
  - Heavy equipment operator, operates heavy equipment used in engineering and construction projects
- Operator (military), a soldier in a special operations force
- Operator (law enforcement), a law enforcement officer who has been trained and certified as an operator to serve on a SWAT team

== Other uses ==
- Operator (sternwheeler), a 1909 ship on the Skeena River
- Network operator, a phone carrier
- System operator, commonly abbreviated as sysop
- Operator grammar, a theory of human language

== See also ==
- Operation (disambiguation)
- Operator-precedence grammar, a grammar for formal languages
- The Operators (disambiguation)
- Oper (disambiguation)
- Cooperator (disambiguation)
