= Amelia Opdyke Jones =

American cartoonist (1913–1993)

- Amelia Opdyke Jones with an example of her work on The Subway Sun, 1956
- Born: November 13, 1913; New Brunswick
- Died: December 30, 1993 (aged 80); Sea Girt

Amelia Ross Opdyke Jones (November 13, 1913 – December 30, 1993) was an American cartoonist who sometimes signed her work with the name "Oppy". She is best known for her series of cartoons in the 1940s and 50s called The Subway Sun which promoted positive behavior and an anti-littering campaign on the New York City Subway.

Amelia Ross Opdyke was born on November 13, 1913 in New Brunswick, New Jersey, the daughter of Stacy H. and Margaretta P. Opdyke. Stricken with asthma as a child, during periods of seclusion she took up drawing. She graduated from the Dearborn Morgan School in East Orange, New Jersey and went on to the Art Students League of New York, where she balked at learning to draw anatomy by observing a corpse dissection.

In the 1930s, she published illustrations in Life magazine and drew a one-panel comic strip for United Feature Syndicate called The Young Idear. In 1934, she married Colonel William J. Jones.

She worked for commercial artist Fred Cooper, who drew The Subway Sun, a comic strip in the form of a poster hung in subway cars. Opdyke took over The Subway Sun in 1946 and continued drawing it until 1966. The Subway Sun promoted good behavior amongst subway riders and discouraged such behavior as door blocking and littering. She claimed credit for introducing the word "litterbug" (a play on the word "jitterbug") as a slang term for litterers during this campaign.

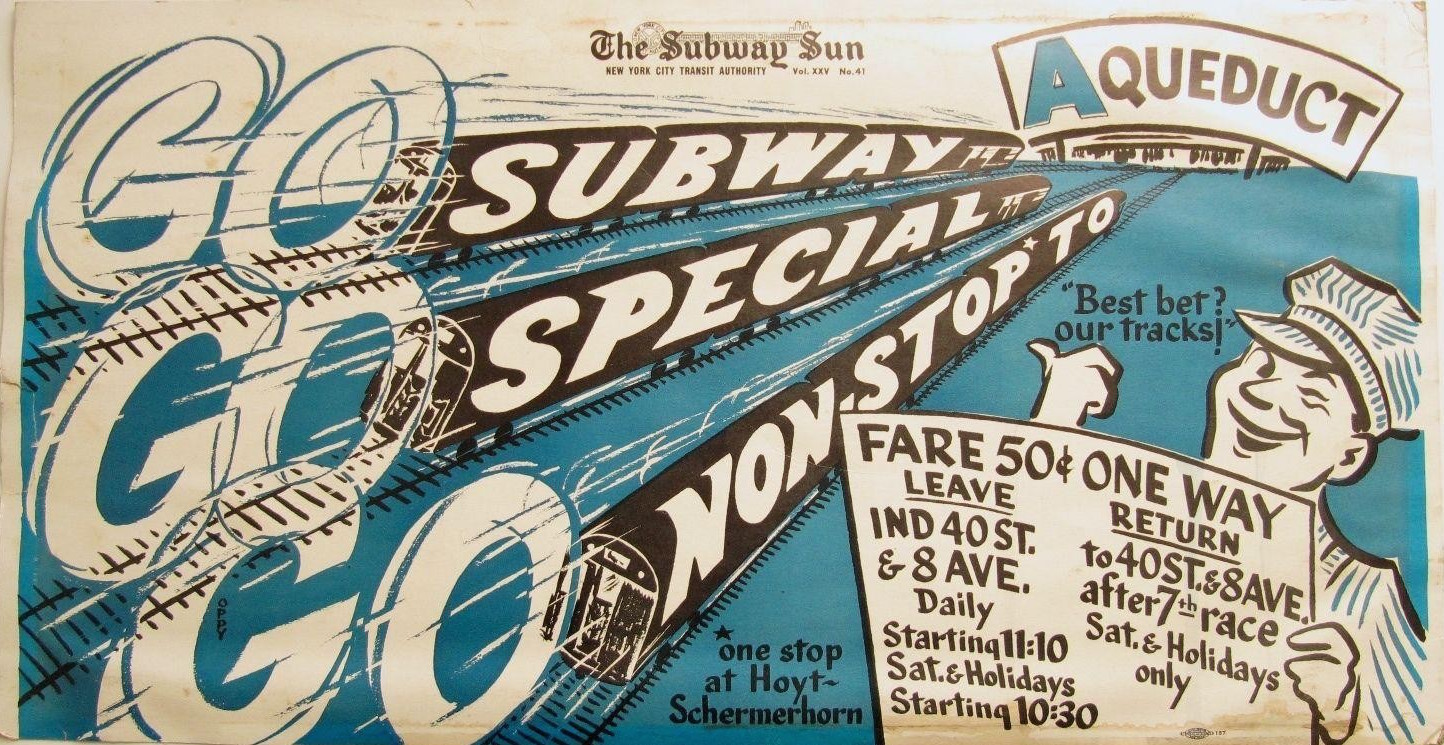
A poster by Jones promoting subway service to Aqueduct Racetrack

Opdyke retired in 1968. She later said "I'm not doing a darn thing now, and I love it."

Amelia Opdyke Jones died on 30 December 1993 in Sea Girt, New Jersey.
