= Corporación Educativa American School =

Private school in Colombia

American School
- km 2 Cra 51B; Barranquilla, Colombia

Information
- Type: Private
- Motto: The Best Education
- Established: 1988
- Language: English, Spanish, and French
- Sports: Soccer, tennis, basketball, volleyball
- Website: American School

Corporación Educativa American School, one of the top-ranking educational institutions in Colombia, is a private, non-denominational bilingual school located in the city of Barranquilla. The American School, as it is usually referred to by its students and the school community, is fully accredited by the Colombian Ministry of Education. The school's success is owing to its pedagogical approach, which allows the adaptation of the school programs to suit its students' individual learning needs, without disregarding the highest national and international educational benchmarks.

Most of American School alumni have enrolled in the country's most prestigious higher learning centers, while some have gone to colleges in South America or Europe.

The American School offers formal education for infants through 11th grade, which is the senior grade in Colombia. Classes are taught in both English and Spanish. From preschool up to 9th grade, Social Studies, Science, Mathematics, Literature, and Language Arts are taught in English. That is why the American School students have fluent command of both Spanish and English. In 10th and 11th grades students work hard in their preparation for the ICFES test, SAT and TOEFL.

Besides the bilingual program, the school offers its students plastic arts, dance, scenic arts, ballet, and sports courses.

American School students participate in science fairs, musical contests, artistic, and sportive events inside and outside the school.

== History ==
The American School was founded by two young educators, Sara Melamed in 1988. Márquez's intention was to offer an alternative to the same-for-everybody education, which ruled in South American schools. Márquez decided that her new school's classes would be small and the school's teaching and learning processes would be mediated by constructivist pedagogical approaches, including the socratic questioning. Márquez also decided to establish school programs to instill self-efficacy beliefs in her students.

== Partnerships ==
The American School has strong academic ties to national and international education centers, such as Alliance Française and Universidad del Norte. The partnership with Universidad del Norte, one of the most prestigious Colombian universities, allows the American School's juniors and seniors to take college courses while in high school. If they decide to further their education at Universidad del Norte after they graduate, the passing scores obtained in the in-school college courses are validated at the university. American School students also learn French through the American School's partnership with the Alliance Française.

== Campus ==
The American School has 21 air-conditioned classrooms, a science lab, a speech lab, a library, an arts workshop, an arts room, a music room, a basketball court, a learning center, a soccer field, gardens, and playgrounds.

== Departments ==
The school has the following departments:

1. Academic department: This department is directed by the school vice principal, who is the principal's assistant concerning curricular and extracurricular activities for the students. The Academic department has two sub-departments: the Spanish and the English coordinations, which guide all the curricular activities in Spanish and English respectively.

2. Administrative department: It is composed of a team of qualified administrators and an accountant.

3. Student welfare department: It helps students in issues concerning their vocational orientation, career choices, sexual education, and counseling.

== Notable alumni ==
- Luis Fernando Encinales
- Lizeth Buendía
