= Open Pluggable Specification =

Slot-in computer standard

Open Pluggable Specification (OPS) is a computing module plug-in format available for adding computing capability to flat panel displays.

The format was first announced by NEC, Intel, and Microsoft in 2010.

Computing modules in the OPS format are available on Intel- and ARM-based CPUs, running operating systems including Microsoft Windows and Google Android.

The main benefits of using OPS in digital signage are to reduce setup time and improve integration, while also reducing downtime and maintenance cost by making it extremely easy to replace the computing module in case of a failure.

== Technical specification ==
- A computing module fully enclosed in a 180 × 119 × 30 mm box
- JAE TX25 plug connector and TX24 receptacle
- 80-pin contacts
- Supported interfaces:
  - Power
  - HDMI/DVI and DisplayPort
  - Audio
  - USB 2.0/3.0
  - UART
  - OPS control signals

=== Pin definition ===
OPS Pinout Table
Pin Number	Signal	Description	I/O	Pin Number	Signal	Description	I/O
40	+12V - +19V	Power	-	80	GND	Ground	-
39	+12V - +19V	Power	-	79	GND	Ground	-
38	+12V - +19V	Power	-	78	GND	Ground	-
37	+12V - +19V	Power	-	77	GND	Ground	-
36	+12V - +19V	Power	-	76	GND	Ground	-
35	+12V - +19V	Power	-	75	GND	Ground	-
34	+12V - +19V	Power	-	74	PWR_STATUS	PowerGood	OUT (OC)
33	+12V - +19V	Power	-	73	PS_ON#	Pluggable Signal ON	IN
32	GND	Ground	-	72	PB_DET	Pluggable Board Detect	OUT
31	DVI_HPD	DVI-D	IN	71	CEC	Consumer Electronic Control	I/O
30	DVI_DDC_CLK	DVI-D	I/O	70	AZ_LINEOUT_R	Audio-Rch	OUT
29	DVI_DDC_DATA	DVI-D	I/O	69	AZ_LINEOUT_L	Audio-Lch	OUT
28	GND	Ground	-	68	GND	Ground	-
27	TMDS2+	DVI-D	OUT	67	USB_PP0	USB	I/O
26	TMDS2-	DVI-D	OUT	66	USB_PN0	USB	I/O
25	GND	Ground	-	65	GND	Ground	-
24	TMDS1+	DVI-D	OUT	64	USB_PP1	USB	I/O
23	TMDS1-	DVI-D	OUT	63	USB_PN1	USB	I/O
22	GND	Ground	-	62	GND	Ground	-
21	TMDS0+	DVI-D	OUT	61	USB_PP2	USB	I/O
20	TMDS0-	DVI-D	OUT	60	USB_PN2	USB	I/O
19	GND	Ground	-	59	GND	Ground	-
18	TMDS_CLK+	DVI-D	OUT	58	StdA_SSTX+	USB3.0	I/O
17	TMDS_CLK-	DVI-D	OUT	57	StdA_SSTX-	USB3.0	I/O
16	GND	Ground	-	56	GND	Ground	-
15	DDP_HPD	DisplayPort	IN	55	StdA_SSRX+	USB3.0	I/O
14	DDP_AUXP	DisplayPort	I/O	54	StdA_SSRX-	USB3.0	I/O
13	DDP_AUXN	DisplayPort	I/O	53	GND	Ground	-
12	GND	Ground	-	52	UART_TXD	UART3.3V	OUT
11	DDP_0P	DisplayPort	OUT	51	UART_RXD	UART3.3V	IN
10	DDP_0N	DisplayPort	OUT	50	SYS_FAN	System Fan Control	OUT
9	GND	Ground	-	49	RSVD	Reserved pins	-
8	DDP_1P	DisplayPort	OUT	48	RSVD	Reserved pins	-
7	DDP_1N	DisplayPort	OUT	47	RSVD	Reserved pins	-
6	GND	Ground	-	46	RSVD	Reserved pins	-
5	DDP_2P	DisplayPort	OUT	45	RSVD	Reserved pins	-
4	DDP_2N	DisplayPort	OUT	44	RSVD	Reserved pins	-
3	GND	Ground	-	43	RSVD	Reserved pins	-
2	DDP_3P	DisplayPort	OUT	42	RSVD	Reserved pins	-
1	DDP_3N	DisplayPort	OUT	41	RSVD	Reserved pins	-

== Succession ==
OPS+ adds another connector for 8K or multiple 4K outputs.

The Intel Smart Display Module (SDM) format is another successor, albeit yet single platform.
