= The Cooperative =

The Cooperative (French: Coopérative d'enseignement, lit. 'Teaching cooperative') was an informal group of famous French academics organised in 1907 to teach their children at a higher level than was available in Paris at the time.

The group started after Marie and Pierre Curie had noticed the strong mathematical potential of their daughter, Irène. Unable to find a school that could meet her needs, the now widowed Marie Curie joined forces with several other parents with strong academic backgrounds including physicists Paul Langevin and Jean Perrin, and decided to take turns teaching one another's children. Around 10 children were educated by the group in 1907-1908.

The curriculum of The Cooperative was varied and included not only the principles of science and scientific research but valued the humanities with diverse subjects as Chinese and sculpture, with great emphasis placed on self-expression and play.

Henriette Perrin-Duportal taught the children literature, drawing and modelling were taught by sculptor Jean Magrou. Marie Curie instructed them in physics, whilst chemistry and geometry were covered by Jean Perrin and Paul Langevin.

Sinologist Édouard Chavannes taught the children Chinese, and Alice Chavennes taught them English and German. Their thirteen year old daughter Isabelle Chavannes' notes of Marie Curie's physics lessons are the only known extant record of the school's curriculum. The notes recorded which students attended Curie's physics lessons and detail her method of teaching mostly primary school age children science usually reserved for secondary education at the time. Isabelle Chavannes grew up to be an industrial chemist and chemical engineer, one of the first women to undertake the role. The papers were rescued from being burnt by Rémi Langevin, Isabelle's great-nephew, following her death.

== Notable students ==
Irène Curie, studied two years in The Cooperative, she would later won the Nobel Prize for Chemistry in 1935.
