= OP =

OP or Op may refer to:

== Arts and entertainment ==
=== Music, television, literature, and gaming ===
- Op., short for opus number, used to denote one work of musical composition from many
- OP, an abbreviated term for opening theme songs in anime
- One Piece, a 1997 Japanese manga and anime
- Out of print, a status of a book title at a publishing house
- Optimus Prime, a character from the Transformers franchise
- Overpowered (game balance), in video games, when a particular aspect or character is lacking game balance

=== Theater ===
- Opposite prompt, a stage right prompt corner on a theatre stage
- Original pronunciation, the phonology of Early Modern English, as used in William Shakespeare's time, specifically when used to perform his works in modern times.

== Drinks ==
- Orange Pekoe, a grade of black tea
- O.P. Anderson, a Swedish spirit of the aquavit type

== Business and government ==
- Ocean Pacific, a retail clothing company
- OP Financial Group, a Finnish company
- Operational planning, the process of planning short term measures in a company
- Oborový podnik ("specialized business"), a bygone Czechoslovak state designation for a business entity
- Publications Office of the European Union (French: Office des publications de l'Union européenne), interinstitutional body of the European Union
- Odisha Police, police patrol in Odisha, India

== Places ==
- Orchard Park, New York
- Overland Park, Kansas

== Religion and education ==
- Order of Preachers (Latin: Ordo Praedicatorum, Dominican Order) a Catholic religious order
- Oratory Preparatory School, in New Jersey, United States
- Old Pauline, the term for a former pupil of St Paul's School, London
- Old Peterite, the term for a former pupil of St Peter's School, York
- Overall Position, the grade appointed to Queensland high-school graduates

== Science, mathematics, and technology ==
- Organophosphate, the general name for esters of phosphoric acid
- Op (statistics), a symbol used in probability mathematics
- Octagonal prism

=== Computing ===
- Original post (or poster), the opening entry (or author thereof) in a thread or discussion in an internet forum
- Op, an abbreviated form of operator, or sysop, a user with administrative rights in multi-user computer systems
- Over-provisioning, a phenomenon associated with solid state storage; see Write amplification § Over-provisioning

== Other uses ==
- Open Philanthropy, research and grant making foundation
- Observation post, a position from which soldiers can watch enemy movements
- Opportunity point, a tennis term for an opportunity to potentially break serve when the score is 15–30
- Order of Protection or Restraining order

== See also ==
- Op-amp, short for operational amplifier
- Op-ed, a newspaper opinion piece
- Operation (disambiguation)
- Operator (disambiguation)
- OPS (disambiguation)
- Ops (disambiguation)
- Op. cit., opere citato, or "in the work cited"
- 0P (disambiguation) (zero p)
