= CB Bank =

Myanmar commercial bank

CB Bank PCL
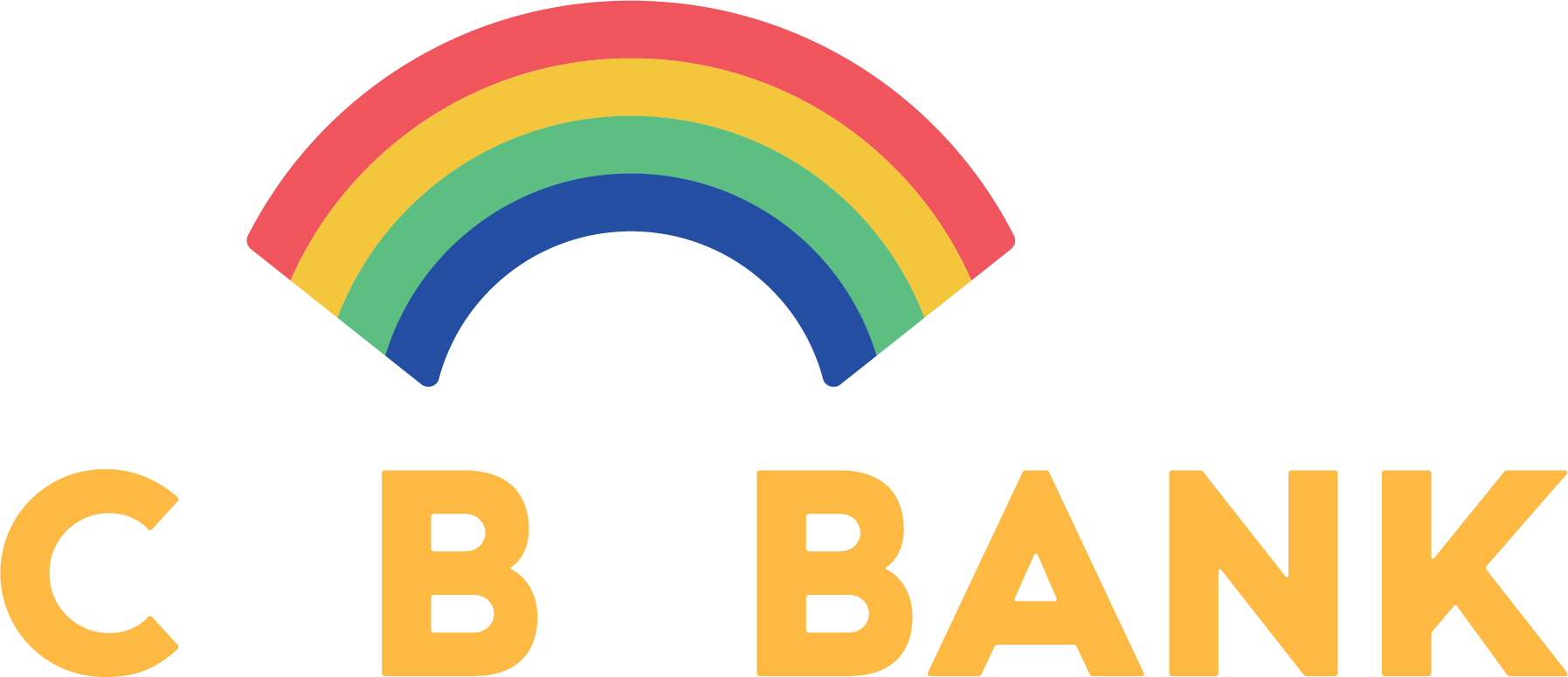
- Type: Public
- Industry: Banking
- Founded: August 21, 1992
- Founder: Khambawi
- Headquarters: Yangon, Myanmar, Myanmar
- Number of locations: 250 branches (2026)
- Key people: U Khin Maung Aye (Chairman) U Kyaw Lynn (Vice Chairman) U Kyaw Thu Ko (CEO)
- Products: Financial Services
- Number of employees: Approx. 8000 (2026)
- Website: www.cbbank.com.mm

CB Bank is one of Myanmar's largest commercial banks. Established in 1992, it was the first bank in Myanmar to introduce ATM cards and credit cards. CB Bank is led by Chairman U Khin Maung Aye, Vice Chairman U Kyaw Lynn and Chief Executive Officer U Kyaw Thu Ko, and operates more than 250 branches across the country.

== History ==
CB Bank was established on 21 August 1992 with the approval from the Central Bank of Myanmar. It began operations as a small financial institution with 33 employees and gradually expanded across Myanmar. In 2004, Cb Bank became a public company. The bank's head office is located in the Botahtaung township area of Yangon. By 2026, CB Bank has expanded its workforce to approximately 8,000 employees and developed a nationwide banking network.

CB Bank's Headquarters in Yangon

In May 2013, CB Bank became the first bank in Myanmar to issue a debit card and permitted the first card-related financial transaction in Myanmar. In September 2012, Mastercard signed an agreement with CB Bank to license cards in the country and this enabled local merchants and ATMs to accept the payment cards. In 2013, CB Bank switched to T24 from Temenos as its core banking system to enhance bank-wide connectivity with the branches in the country. The bank named the ATM service as EASI Banking. The bank has the largest network of ATM and Foreign Exchange Counters in Myanmar.

After signing the contract with the Asian Development Bank (ADB) under the Trade Finance Program, CB Bank received $12 million for its Trade financing program in October 2015. It allowed the bank to issue Letter of Credit agreement, which allowed exporters to ship products before receiving payment under CB Bank’s trade finance lines, guaranteed by ADB.

CB Bank also started offering mobile banking services to the personnel and corporate clients which include basic banking functions, remote access banking services and mobile airtime top-ups are available through the app. It launched Easi Mobile Banking Agent for areas in Myanmar where there is no branch coverage. Mobile agents will receive 30 percent of normal money transfer and 50 percent for other services. CB Bank partnered with Myanmar Post Office in 2017 to further expand its mobile agent services at post offices.

From 2016, CB Bank and other several banks started offering loans for SMEs in collaboration with Japanese Government and state-owned Myanmar Insurance. Additionally, CB Bank was chosen by German KfW bank to provide 4.45 EUR million worth of loans for SMEs in Myanmar based on market study and due diligence offer SME or loans with or without collateral.

In January 2017, CB Bank signed an agreement with Diebold Nixdorf for systems, software and services to expand its cardless cash withdrawal services and P2P offerings to self-service banking in Myanmar. CB bank, already hosting one of the largest ATM networks in Myanmar, has planned to double the number of terminals to expend its self-service network.

In August 2017, Grab, an online cab aggregator partnered with CB Bank to offer banking services available to its drivers. The drivers have benefitted from the program obtaining access to ATM cards and bank accounts. In September 2017, it announced partnership with telecom operator Ooredoo to launch, M-Pitesan, a mobile wallet which will offer nationwide money transfer and bill payments services.

In September 2017, CB bank launched the contactless payment system in collaboration with Visa and Mastercard the payment service providers. The service help users to complete their payments through contactless POS machines for Visa and Mastercard.

In January 2018, CB Bank opened the first small and medium enterprise (SME) center in Mandalay. Through (SME) centers, CB Bank aims to help SMEs apply for necessary loans. Plans of SME loans include SME-Credit Guarantee Insurance Loan (SME CGI Loan), SME Longterm Investment Loan Powered by JICA, SME Business Expansion Loan Powered by KfW, and SME Term Loan.

In April 2018, CB Bank signed an agreement with KfW Development Bank (KfW) to extend loans with $13.22 million to finance small and medium-sized enterprises in Myanmar.

In May 2019, CB Bank and Telenor Myanmar signed a partnership with Visa to launch the CB-Telenor co-branded Visa credit card which aims to enhance financial services in Myanmar and expand benefits for Telenor Star Platinum users.

In October 2019, CB Bank announced that it will launch its innovation lab on the APIX platform making it the first bank in the ASEAN region to connect with an open-architecture. In May 2020, CB Bank became the first bank in Myanmar to open smart branch at the Kantharyar Center. Similar to self-checkouts, customers can open their own bank accounts and get debit/prepaid cards immediately with minimal interactions with bank staffs.

CB Bank launched the CB Card+ mobile app on December 15, 2020. The app allows users to make NFC payments, check card information and access all cards in one place.

The Temenos Regional Forum 2023, held on August 23–24 in Hanoi, celebrated banks leading in modernization, transformation, and innovation. CB Bank was honored with the Temenos Core Transformation Award for its decade-long dedication to innovation.

CB Bank marked a significant milestone in December 22, 2023, signing a Memorandum of Understanding (MOU) with Mastercard at Park Royal Hotel, Yangon. This collaboration introduced cohesive financing solutions for retailers through Myanmar Zarla Distribution’s BAHOZAY App.

== Partnerships ==
In September 2019, CB Bank partnered with England based professional football club, Manchester United to become their official financial services partner for Myanmar. It launched the Manchester United branded prepaid cards, debit cards and credit cards in Myanmar.

In March 2020, to support digital and cashless payments in Myanmar, CB Bank becomes the first bank in Myanmar to support MSME portal in partnership with MasterCard and the Myanmar government. In September 2020, it partnered with Infobip and Viber to launch Myanmar’s first banking service on the Viber community platform. This helped bank to replace traditional call center agents with virtual personal assistants.

CB Bank and Grab Myanmar received the Best Cash Management Project in Myanmar award from The Asian Banker organization for their collaboration. Since 2017, Grab has been operating in Myanmar and working closely with CB Bank. They introduced API Integration, enabling drivers to transfer their savings to their bank accounts instantly.

== Major Awards ==
- 2026 Best Bank in Myanmar by Global Finance
- 2026 Myanmar Domestic Trade Finance Bank of the Year by Asian Banking & Finance
- 2026 Best Bank for Trade Finance by The Digital Banker
- 2026 Best Retail Digital Payments Experience by The Asset Triple A
- 2026 Digital Bank of the Year by The Asset Triple A
- 2026 ESBN Asia-Pacific Green Deal for Business (Silver Badge)
- 2026 Best SME Bank by Global Finance
- 2025 Best Bank in Myanmar by The Banker
- 2025 ESBN Asia-Pacific Green Deal Green Badge
- 2025 Corporate & Investment Bank of the Year by Asian Banking & Finance
- 2025 Myanmar Domestic Trade Finance Bank of the Year by Asian Banking & Finance
- 2025 Treasurise Awards - Editor's Triple Star for Invoice Financing (in partnership with Mastercard and Bahozay) by The Asset Triple A
- 2025 Digital Bank of the Year by The Asset Triple A
- 2025 Best Digital Financial Inclusion Initiative Myanmar by The Digital Banker
- 2025 Best SME Bank by Global Finance
- 2024 SME Bank of the Year by Asian Banking & Finance
- 2023 Core Transformation Award by Temenos
- 2023 Best Service Provider - Cash Management by The Asset
- 2023 Myanmar Domestic Cash Management Bank of the Year by Asian Banking & Finance
- 2023 SME Bank of the Year by Asian Banking & Finance
- 2023 Myanmar Domestic Trade Finance Bank of the Year by Asian Banking & Finance
- 2023 Bank of the Year in Myanmar by The Banker
- 2023 Best Service Provider - Trade Finance by The Asset
- 2022 Best Service Provider - Trade Finance by The Asset
- 2022 Best Corporate & Investment Bank by Asiamoney
- 2022 Myanmar Domestic Trade Finance Bank of the Year by Asian Banking & Finance
- 2022 Best Service Provider - Cash Management by The Asset
- 2022 Best Bank in Myanmar by Global Finance
- 2022 SME Bank of the Year by Asian Banking & Finance
- 2021 Best Service Provider - Trade Finance by The Asset
- 2021 Best Service Provider - Cash Management by The Asset
- 2021 Digital Bank of the Year by The Asset
- 2021 Best Corporate & Investment Bank by Asiamoney
- 2021 Best Bank of SMEs by Asiamoney
- 2021 Myanmar Domestic Trade Finance Bank of the Year by Asian Banking & Finance
- 2021 Myanmar Domestic Cash Management Bank of the Year by Asian Banking & Finance
- 2021 Best Domestic Bank by Asiamoney
- 2020 Award For Excellence by Euromoney
- 2020 Best Domestic Bank by Asiamoney
- 2020 Best Service Provider - Cash Management by The Asset
- 2020 Best Cash Management Project in Myanmar - The Bankers Choice Awards by The Asian Banker
- 2020 Best Corporate & Investment Bank by Asiamoney
- 2020 Excellence in Leadership in Asia by Euromoney
- 2020 Best Digital Bank by Asiamoney
- 2020 Best Service Provider - Trade Finance by The Asset
- 2020 Digital Bank of the Year by The Asset
- 2020 SME Bank of the Year by Asian Banking & Finance
- 2020 Best Bank in Myanmar by Global Finance
- 2020 Myanmar Domestic Trade Finance Bank by Asian Banking & Finance
- 2020 Myanmar Domestic Cash - Cash Management Bank of the Year by Asian Banking & Finance
- 2020 Best Trade Finance Bank in Myanmar by The Asian Banker
- 2020 Best Business Ecosystem - Platform Initiative, Application or Programme by The Asian Banker
- 2019 Domestic Cash Management Bank of the Year by Asian Banking & Finance
- 2019 Best Trade Finance Bank by The Asian Banker
- 2019 Best Service Provider - Trade Finance Myanmar by The Asset
- 2019 Best Corporate & Investment Bank in Myanmar by Asia Money
- 2019 Best for Premium Banking Service by Asia Money
- 2019 Best Bank in Myanmar by Global Finance
- 2019 Best Digital Bank by the World Finance
- 2019 Best Mobile Banking (CB Pay) by the World Finance
- 2019 Financial Inclusion: CB Bank Mobile Agent Banking
- 2018 Best Digital Bank in Myanmar by World Finance
- 2018 Best Cash Management Project with Telenor Myanmar by The Asian Banker
- 2018 Retail Bank of the Year by Asian Banking & Finance
- 2018 Best Bank in Myanmar by Global Finance
- 2018 Best Mobile Banking (CBPay) by World Finance
- 2018 Best Trade Finance in Myanmar by The Asset
- 2018 Best Trade Finance Bank in Myanmar
- 2018 Best Cash Management Bank in Myanmar
- 2018 Best Bank in Myanmar by Euromoney
- 2018 Best Digital Bank in Myanmar by Asiamoney
- 2018 Best Corporate and Investment Bank in Myanmar by Asiamoney
- 2018 Best Bank for SMEs in Myanmar by Asiamoney
- 2017 Best Structured Trade Finance in Myanmar by The Asset
- 2017 Best Digital Bank in Myanmar by Asiamoney
- 2017 Best Digital Bank in Myanmar by the World Finance
- 2017 Best Trade Finance in Myanmar by The Asset
- 2017 Myanmar Domestic Cash Management Bank of the Year by Asian Banking & Finance
- 2016 Best Digital Bank and Best Mobile Banking Application by the World Finance
- 2016 The Asset Triple A for ‘Best Trade Finance Bank in Myanmar
- 2016 Best Bank in Myanmar by Global Finance
- 2016 Myanmar Domestic Cash Management Bank of the Year by Asian Banking & Finance
- 2016 Myanmar Domestic Trade Finance Bank of the Year by Asian Banking & Finance
- 2016 Best Digital Bank in Myanmar
- 2016 Best Mobile Banking Application in Myanmar
- 2015 Best Bank in Myanmar by Global Finance
- 2015 Best Customer Experience - Website by Customer Experience in Financial Services by CXFS Awards
- 2015 Myanmar Domestic Cash Management Bank of the Year by Asian Banking & Finance
- 2015 Best Cash Management Bank in Myanmar by The Asset
- 2015 Best Bank in Myanmar by Alpha Southeast Asia
- 2014 Best Corporate Bank in Myanmar
- 2014 Best Corporate Banking Services Myanmar by Global Banking & Finance Review
- 2014 Best Customer Service Bank Myanmar by Global Banking & Finance Review
- 2014 Best Initiative in Mobile Payments by Asia Trailblazer Awards
- 2014 Best Customer Experience - Mobile by CXFS Awards
- 2014 Best Product Excellence in Debit Cards by Asia Trailblazer Awards
- 2014 Best Merchant Acquiring Cards & Electronic Payments by Asia Trailblazer Awards
- 2014 Award in Recognition of the Transformational Use of Information Technology
- 2013 The Industry Leadership Award
