= Dawei Airport =

Airport in Tanintharyi Region, Myanmar

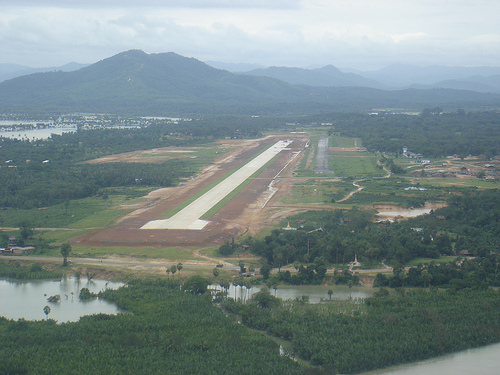
- IATA: TVY; ICAO: VYDW

Summary
- Airport type: Public
- Operator: Government
- Serves: Dawei, Myanmar
- Elevation AMSL: 84 ft (26 m)
- Coordinates: 14°06′13″N 098°12′13″E

Map
- Location of airport in Myanmar

Runways
Direction	Length		Surface
Direction	m	ft	Surface
16/34	3,661	12,013	Concrete

Dawei Airport (IATA: TVY, ICAO: VYDW) is a public airport serving Dawei (formerly known as Tavoy), a city in the Tanintharyi Region in southeastern Myanmar. The airport that caters only to domestic flights is located in the northeastern part of the town, running from north to south.

== Facilities ==
The airport is at an elevation of 84 feet (26 m) above mean sea level. It has one runway designated 16/34 with a concrete surface measuring 3,661.5 by 30 metres (12,013 ft × 98 ft).

== Airlines and destinations ==
Airlines	Destinations
Air Thanlwin	Yangon
Mann Yadanarpon Airlines	Yangon
Mingalar Aviation Services	Kawthaung, Yangon
Myanmar National Airlines	Kawthaung, Yangon
