= Co-op High School =

Cooperative Arts & Humanities High School

Location
- 177 College Street; New Haven, Connecticut 06510; United States
- 41°18′20″N 72°55′46″W

Information
- Type: Public school
- Motto: CO-OP… "Where the arts are academics and the academics are art!"
- Established: 1983 (43 years ago)
- School district: New Haven Public Schools
- CEEB code: 070261
- Principal: Paul T. Camarco
- Grades: 9-12
- Enrollment: 650
- Colors: Maroon and white
- Nickname: Co-op
- Website: coop.nhps.net

Cooperative Arts & Humanities High School (referred to as Co-op High School) is a high school in the downtown section of New Haven, Connecticut. Founded in 1983 as a joint venture of New Haven and Hamden, it was originally known as the Hamden-New Haven Co-op. It was originally housed at the former site of Larson College (now Quinnipiac University) at 1450 Whitney Avenue in Hamden (now a privately owned elder care facility called Atria Larson Place).

In 1988, Hamden left the project, and the Co-op moved to the former St. John the Baptist School at 800 Dixwell Avenue in New Haven. There they were joined by the Center for Theater Techniques in Education (CTTE) which incorporated the arts into the academic curriculum already offered. The name was officially changed to Cooperative Arts & Humanities High School.

In 1990, the Co-op moved to the former St. Mary's High School building at 444 Orange Street in New Haven. They remained there until January 2009, when they moved to their current location at 177 College Street. The new building, designed by architect César Pelli, is a 60,000-square-foot (5,600 m^{2}), $73 million state-of-the-art facility which includes a television studio, 350-seat theater with fly loft, black box theater, chorus and music rooms, 4 fully equipped computer labs, and academic facilities.

Co-op is an arts magnet school that allows students to intensely practice their art major throughout the day, including music, theatre, creative writing, visual arts, and dance.

== Notable alumni ==
- Dana Terrace, creator of The Owl House
