= Kawthaung Airport =

Kawthaung Airport ကော့သောင် လေဆိပ်
- IATA: KAW; ICAO: VYKT

Summary
- Airport type: Public
- Serves: Kawthaung
- Location: Kawthaung, Myanmar
- Elevation AMSL: 12.5 m / 41 ft
- Coordinates: 10°02′57.33″N 098°32′16.82″E

Map
- Location of airport in Myanmar

Runways
Direction	Length		Surface
Direction	m	ft	Surface
02/20	1,829	6,000	Asphalt

Kawthaung Airport (Burmese: ကော့သောင် လေဆိပ်; (IATA: KAW, ICAO: VYKT)) is an airport in Kawthaung, Myanmar. The airport has a very small terminal with no gates. The airport has an 1,800 by 50 metres (5,910 ft × 160 ft) runway.

== Airlines and destinations ==
Airlines	Destinations
Mingalar Aviation Services	Dawei, Yangon
Myanmar National Airlines	Dawei, Myeik, Yangon

== Incidents and occurrences ==
The airport has suffered eleven accidents. Two airplanes were Chinese-made MA60s. and the other nine were Fokker 27s and 28s. The last incident on the ASN Aviation Safety Database was on 10 June 2013.

On 10 June 2013 a Xian MA60 passenger plane, Myanma Airways Flight 309, registered XY-AIP, sustained damage in a runway excursion accident at Kawthaung Airport (KAW), Myanmar. There were 64 persons on board, no one was injured. The Myanma Airways airplane operated on a domestic flight from Yangon to Mawlamyine and Kawthaung. Departing Mawlamyine at 11:10 hours local time, the flight was uneventful until the approach for landing. The aircraft was configured with landing gear when the “hydraulic pressure low”(LEFPL) warning light illuminated. After landing, the pilot started using manual braking and selected the nose gear to taxi mode. The airplane veered left and went off the runway, running into fence pillars, turning the aircraft 90 degrees to the left. The aircraft came to rest upon striking a tree with the left hand wing, 150 feet from the side of the runway.
