= List of acronyms: O =

This list contains acronyms, initialisms, and pseudo-blends that begin with the letter O.

For the purposes of this list:

- acronym = an abbreviation pronounced as if it were a word, e.g., SARS = severe acute respiratory syndrome, pronounced to rhyme with cars
- initialism = an abbreviation pronounced wholly or partly using the names of its constituent letters, e.g., CD = compact disc, pronounced cee dee
- pseudo-blend = an abbreviation whose extra or omitted letters mean that it cannot stand as a true acronym, initialism, or portmanteau (a word formed by combining two or more words).

(a) = acronym, e.g.: SARS – (a) severe acute respiratory syndrome
(i) = initialism, e.g.: CD – (i) compact disc
(p) = pseudo-blend, e.g.: UNIFEM – (p) United Nations Development Fund for Women
(s) = symbol (none of the above, representing and pronounced as something else; for example: MHz – megahertz)

Some terms are spoken as either acronym or initialism, e.g., VoIP, pronounced both as voyp and V-O-I-P.

(Main list of acronyms)

- O – (i) Oberst – Observer – Obstacle – Octal – Officer – Official – Oh – Operational – Operator – Oprah (magazine) – Outstanding – (s) Oxygen

== OA ==
- OA – (i) Operational Analysis – (i) Overeaters Anonymous
- OAC – (i) On Approved Credit
- OAP – Old Age Pensioner (UK)
- OAS – (i) Organization of American States
- OARSI – (i) Osteoarthritis Research Society International
- OASIS – (a) Objects and Agents for Information Systems and Simulation – Organization for the Advancement of Structured Information Standards
- OASIS – (a) Ontario Agencies Supporting Individuals with Special Needs
- OASIS – (a) Ontario Association of Sewage Industry Services
- OASP – (i) Operational Analysis Support Paper/Plan
- OAU – (i) Organization of African Unity

== OB ==
- ob – (p) obiit (Latin, "(s) he died")
- OB
  - (p) Obedience
  - Obligation
  - Obligatory
  - Obsolete
  - Obstetrics
  - (i) Ocean Beach (California)
  - Off Break (cricket)
  - Old Bryanstonian
  - Order of Battle
  - Out-of-Bounds (golf)
  - Outlet Box (electrical)
  - (p) Overbought (stock market)
  - (i) Oversight Board
- OBE – (i) Officer of the Order of the British Empire
- OBJ
  - (p) Objective (military parlance)
  - (i) Odell Beckham Jr. (American football wide receiver)
- OBM – (p) Obsidian Black Metallic (automobile paint color)
- OBOR – (i) One Belt One Road, a former name of the China-sponsored Belt and Road Initiative
- OBS
  - (p) Observation/Observer
  - Obsolete
  - Obstacle
  - (i) Off Balance Sheet
  - Optical Burst Switching (IEEE)
  - Organic Brain Syndrome
  - Organization(al) Breakdown Structure
- OBSS
  - (i) Off Board Sensor Systems
  - Ordo Byantinus Sancti Sepulchri (Byzantine Order of the Holy Sepulchre)
  - Orbiter Boom Sensor System (space shuttle)
  - Origins Billion Star Survey
- OBX – (p) Outer Banks (North Carolina)

== OC ==
- oc – (s) Occitan language (ISO 639-1 code)
- OC – (i) Officer Commanding
- OCA – (i) Observatoire de la Côte d'Azur – Offensive Counter-Air
- OCD – (i) Obsessive-Compulsive Disorder
- OCFS – (i) Oracle Cluster File System
- OCFS – (i) Office of Children & Family Services
- OCFS2 – (i) Oracle Cluster File System Release 2
- oci – (s) Occitan language (ISO 639-2 code)
- OCIDS – (i) Optical Combat Identification System
- OCMCC – (i) Orchard County MCC
- OCONUS - Outside Continental United States
- OCN – (i) Oncology Certified Nurse
- OCO – (i) Oort Cloud Object
- OCOKA – (a) Observation, Cover and concealment, Obstacles, Key terrain, and Avenues of approach (mnemonic)
- OCR – (i) Optical Character Recognition
- OCS – see entry

== OD ==
- OD
  - (i) Old Dragon
  - Ordnance Datum (nautical charts)
  - (p) Overdose
- ODAS – (a) OCA-DLR Asteroid Survey
- ODB
  - (i) Ol' Dirty Bastard (rapper)
  - (i) One Dirty B*tch/Broad/Babe (professional wrestler)
  - (i) Operational Data Base
  - (i) Original David Baker (professional poker player; used to distinguish from another professional poker player of the same name)
  - (i) Oxford Dictionary of Byzantium
- ODBC – (i) Open DataBase Connectivity
- ODI
  - (i) Office for Disability Issues (UK government agency)
  - One Day International (cricket)
  - Open Data-Link Interface
  - Oracle Data Integrator

== OE ==
- OEA – (i) (U.S.) Office of Economic Adjustment
- OED – (i) Oxford English Dictionary
- OECD – (i) Organisation for Economic Co-operation and Development (international)
- OEG – (i) Operation Exposure Guidance
- OEIS - (i) On-Line Encyclopedia of Integer Sequences
- OEM – (i) Original equipment manufacturer

== OF ==
- OFA – (i) Occipital Face Area
- OFDA – (i) U.S. Agency for International Development's Office of Foreign Disaster Assistance

== OG ==
- OG:
  - Objective Glass, see Objective (optics)
  - Obstetrics and gynaecology
  - Offensive Guard, see Guard (American football)
  - Old Giggleswickian, a former pupil of Giggleswick School
  - Old Gower, a former pupil of University College School
  - Old Gregorian, a former pupil of Downside School
  - Old Greshamian, a former pupil of Gresham's School
  - Old Gold, a dark yellow
  - Olympic Games
  - Original Gangster, see Gangster
  - Original Gravity, see Gravity (beer)
  - Outpost Gallifrey, a Doctor Who fansite.
  - Own goal, in soccer, a goal scored by a player in their own side's goal
  - OG: Optimized Gaia, theory the earth optimizes itself to promote life, and popular movement to Promote Human Progress in Harmony with the Natural World.
  - OG: Original Gangster, an album by Ice-T
- OGC – (i) Open Geospatial Consortium
- OGD – (i) Other Government Department
- OGO – (i) Other Government Organization
- OGX – OUARGLA – a petroleum state in the south of Algeria

== OH ==
- OH – (s) Ohio (postal symbol)
- OHC – (i) OverHead-Cam engine
- OHHLA – (a) Original Hip-Hop Lyrics Archive
- OHIP – (a) Ontario Health Insurance Plan
- OHMS – (i) On His (or Her Majesty's Service) (also written: O.H.M.S.)
- OHP – (i) Observatoire de Haute-Provence
- OHSS – (p) Ovarian Hyperstimulation Syndrome

== OI ==
- OIC – (i) Officer In Charge
- OIE – (i) World Organisation for Animal Health (originally the Office international des épizooties, French for "International Epizootic Office")
- OIF – (i) Operation Iraqi Freedom
- OIOC – (i) Oriental & India Office Collections (in the British Library)

== OJ ==
- oj – (s) Anishinaabe language (Ojibwa) (ISO 639-1 code)
- OJ – (i) Orange Juice – O. J. Simpson
- oji – (s) Anishinaabe language (Ojibwa) (ISO 639-2 code)
- OJT – On-the-Job Training

== OK ==
- OK
  - (s) Oklahoma (postal symbol)
  - (i) oll korrect (facetious alteration of "all correct", 1839)
- OKC – (a) Oklahoma City

== OL ==
- OLED – (a) Organic Light-Emitting Diode
- OLS – (i) Operational Linescan System

== OM ==
- om – (s) Oromo language (ISO 639-1 code)
- OM – (s) Oman (ISO 3166 digram) – Olympique de Marseille (French football club)
- OMA – (i) Open Mobile Alliance – Operations & Maintenance, Army
- OMB – (i) U.S. Office of Management and Budget – Ontario Municipal Board – (i) Order of Mapungubwe in Bronze
- OMD – (i) Orchestral Manoeuvres in the Dark (1980s pop group)
- OME – (i) Osaka Mercantile Exchange
- OMFG – (i) Oh My F**king God
- OMG – (i) Oh My God or Or My Gosh
- OMGW – (i) "Oh My Gosh it's Windy"
- OMN – (s) Oman (ISO 3166 trigram)
- OMNCS – (i) U.S. Office of the Manager for the National Communications System
- OMP – (i) Order of Mapungubwe in Platinum
- OMR – (s) Omani rial (ISO 4217 currency code)
- OMS – (i) Order of Mapungubwe in Silver
- OMT – (i) Object Model Template
- OMW – (i) On My Way, Oh My Word

== ON ==
- ON – (s) Ontario (postal symbol)
- Onna – Oniong, Nnung Ndem, and Awa, a Local Government Area in Nigeria
- ONC – (i) Orthopaedic Nurse Certified
- ONCE – (a) Organización Nacional de Ciegos Españoles (Spanish, "National Organization for the Spanish Blind")
- ONÉRA – (a) Office national d'études et de recherches aérospatiales (French, "Aeronautics and Space Research Center")
- ONG – (i) Orthodontic National Group
- ONH – (i) Óglaigh na hÉireann (Irish idiom for "soldiers of Ireland"), used for the following:
1. Historically, as the Irish-language name for the original Irish Republican Army ("Old IRA")
2. In modern times, as the Irish-language name of the Defence Forces of Ireland
3. The name of two groups claiming descent from the Old IRA, one a currently inactive splinter group of the Continuity IRA and the other an active splinter group of the Real IRA
- ONI – (i) (U.S.) Office of Naval Intelligence
- ONS – (i) Operational Needs Statement

== OO ==
- OO – (i) Object Oriented – Over & Out
- OOO – (i) Out Of the Office
- OOAD – (i) Object-Oriented Analysis and Design
- OOBE – (a) Out-of-body experience
- OOCL – (i) Orient Overseas Container Line
- OODA – (i) Observation, Orientation, Decision, Action loop (a.k.a. Boyd's Loop)
- OOMF – (i) One Of My Followers
- OOP – (i) Object-Oriented Programming – Out Of Print
- OOS – (i) Occupational Overuse Syndrome – OneSAF Objective System – Open Operating System – Out Of Service
- OOTW – (i) (Military) Operations Other Than War (MOOTW or OOTW)

== OP ==
- OP
  - (i) Observation Point/Post
  - Ocean Pacific (surfwear and swimwear brand)
  - Original Poster (internet)
  - Order Point, in inventory management; the inventory state at which more items should be ordered. Often expressed as a part of OP/OQ (when quantity OP is reached, order OQ new items)
  - Overpowered, often used to refer to fictional characters (e.g. Superman) or game mechanics (e.g. the Black Lotus in Magic: the Gathering) that are considered disproportionately strong
- OPA – (i) Other Procurement, Army
- OPAC – (a) Online Public Access Catalogue
- op cit – (p) opera citata (Latin, "in the work cited")
- OPCON – (p) Operational control
- OPCW – (i) Organisation for the Prohibition of Chemical Weapons
- OPEC – (a) Organization of the Petroleum Exporting Countries
- OpenStreetMap - (p) OpenStreetMap
- OPFOR – (p) Opposing force(s)
- OPI
  - (i) Office of Primary Interest
  - Open Prepress Interface
- OPINTEL – (p) Operational Intelligence
- OPLAN – (p) Operation plan (also OpPlan)
- OPORD – (p) Operation order
- OPP
  - (i) Ontario Provincial Police
  - Operational Planning Process
  - Other People's Property/Pussy/Penis (song)
- OPS
  - (i) On-base plus slugging (baseball statistics)
  - (p) Operations
- OPSEC
  - (p) Operations security
  - Open Platform for Security
- OPSI
  - (a) Overwhelming post splenectomy infection
  - UK Office of Public Sector Information
- OPTAR – (p) Operational target
- OPV – (i) Offshore Patrol Vessel

== OQ ==
- OQ - (i) Order Quantity, in inventory management; the quantity of new items to be ordered. Often expressed as a part of OP/OQ (when quantity OP is reached, order OQ new items)

== OR ==
- or – (s) Oriya language (ISO 639-1 code)
- OR – (i) Operating Room (surgery) – Operational/Operations Research – (s) Oregon (postal symbol) - overreciprocation - when the leader of an inner circle friendship contacts a friend more than is wanted or reasonable
- ORAU – (a/i) Oak Ridge Associated Universities
- ORB – (a/i) Object Request Broker
- ORBAT – (p) Order of Battle
- ORD – (i) O'Hare International Airport in Chicago, Illinois (IATA Airport Code ORD)
- ORD – (i) Office of Research and Development – Operational Requirements Document
- ORF – (i) Operational Readiness Float
- ori – (s) Oriya language (ISO 639-2 code)
- ORISE – (a) Oak Ridge Institute for Science and Education
- orm – (s) Oromo language (ISO 639-2 code)
- ORNL – (i) Oak Ridge National Laboratory
- ORR – (i) Oak Ridge Reservation (U.S. DOE) – Office of Rail Regulation (UK government) – Office of Refugee Resettlement – (CIA) Office of Research and Reports – Operational Readiness Rate – Operational Readiness Review
- ORSA – Oxacillin-resistant Staphylococcus aureus – Operations Research Society of America

== OS ==
- OS – (s) Operating system
- os – (s) Ossetic language (ISO 639-1 code)
- Os – (s) Osmium
- OSA – (i) Order of St. Augustine
- OSCE – (i) Organization for Security and Co-operation in Europe
- OSD – (i) U.S. Office of the Secretary of Defense – (i) On-screen Display
- OSDL – (i) Open Source Development Labs
- OSE – (a) Own Separate Entrance
- OSERS – (a) U.S. Department of Education Office of Special Education and Rehabilitative Services
- OSETI – (a) Optical SETI also Optical SETI
- OSGeo - (a) Open Source Geospatial Foundation (OSGeo)
- OSHA – (a) Occupational Safety and Health Administration
- OSI – (i) Office of Strategic Influence – Ontario Swine Improvement – Open Source Initiative – Open Systems Interconnection
- OSIA – (i) (U.S.) On-Site Inspection Agency
- OSL – (i) Open Source License – Optically Stimulated Luminescence – Orbiting Solar Laboratory
- OSIRIS
  - (a) Optical, Spectroscopic, and Infrared Remote Imaging System (astronomical system on the Rosetta spacecraft)
  - Optical System for Imaging and low Resolution Integrated Spectroscopy (astronomical system on the land-based Gran Telescopio Canarias)
- OSM – (i) One Saturday Morning
- OSMF - (a) OpenStreetMap Foundation
- OSPA – (a) Operations Security Professional's Association site of OSPA
- OSPA – (i) Oregon School Psychologists Association
- OSRH – (i) Oružane Snage Republike Hrvatske (en: Armed forces of the Republic of Croatia)
- oss – (s) Ossetic language (ISO 639-2 code)
- OSS – (i) Office of Strategic Services (1942–1945, forerunner of CIA)
- OSU – (i) Ohio State University – Oklahoma State University

== OT ==
- OTA – Occupational Therapy Assistant, (i) Office of Technology Assessment – (a/i) Orthodontic Technicians Association
- OTAC – (i) Orthodontic Technicians Association Conference – (i) Orthodontic Technicians Association Council
- OTB – (i) Off The Ball – (i) Offtrack Betting – (p) OneSAF Testbed (a descendant of ModSAF)
- OTC – (i) Over-The-Counter (drugs)
- OTD – (i) Off the derech (referring to an Orthodox Jew who has stopped practicing the tenets of his or her faith)
- OTEA – (i) (U.S. Army) Operational Test Evaluation Agency
- OTI – (i) Office of Transition Initiatives (United States Agency for International Development)
  - OTK One Turn Kill
- OTO – (i) Ordo Templi Orientis (Latin, "Order of the Temple of the East", i.e. the Order of Oriental Templars)
- OTOH – (i) On The Other Hand
- OTS – Off the scale, sexually untouchable except for a lot of money.
- OTSBH – (i) Over The Shoulder Boulder Holder
- OTW – (i) On The Way
- OTYBL – (i) Over To You Blue Leader
- OTYRL – (i) Over To You Red Leader

== OU ==
- OU – (p) University of Oklahoma

== OV ==
- OVC
  - (s) Overcast (METAR Code)
  - (i) Ohio Valley Conference
- OVV – (i) Optically Visually Violent, or Optically Violently Variable – a type of quasar

== OW ==
- OW – (i) Old Wykehamist
- OWN – (i) Oprah Winfrey Network

== OX ==
- OX – (p) IATA code for Orient Thai Airlines
- OXC – (p) Optical cross-connect
- OXF – (p) IATA code for London Oxford Airport
- Oxfam – (p) Oxford Committee for Famine Relief (international poverty relief organization)
- OXM – (i) Official Xbox Magazine
- OXR – (p) IATA code for Oxnard Airport
- OXT – (s) Oxytocin

== OY ==
- Oy – (p) Osakeyhtiö (Finnish, "stock company")
- Oyj – (p) Julkinen osakeyhtiö (Finnish, "public stock company")

== OZ ==
- OZ – Ounce
