= Oasis (disambiguation) =

An oasis is an isolated area of vegetation in a desert.

Oasis, OASIS, or The Oasis may also refer to:

== Places ==
=== Africa ===
- Oasis (Casablanca), a neighborhood of Casablanca, Morocco
- Oasis Impact Structure, Libya

=== United States ===
==== California ====
- Oasis, Mono County, California
- Oasis, Riverside County, California

==== Other places in United States ====
- Oasis, Iowa
- Oasis, Nevada
- Oasis, New Mexico
- Oasis, Utah
- Oasis, Wisconsin
- The Oasis at Sawgrass Mills
- The Oasis at Oviedo Marketplace
- Oasis Tower, a seven-story hotel at the Seminole Hard Rock Hotel & Casino Hollywood

=== Other places ===
- Antarctic oasis, a large area naturally free of snow and ice in the otherwise ice-covered continent of Antarctica
- Urban oasis, an open space in an urban setting

== Arts, entertainment, and media ==
=== Fictional entities ===
- Oasis, a character from the webcomic Sluggy Freelance
- Ontologically Anthropocentric Sensory Immersive Simulation (OASIS), a virtual reality simulator accessible by players in the novel Ready Player One

=== Films ===
- Oasis (1955 film), a French adventure film
- Oasis (2002 film), a South Korean film
- The Oasis (film), a 2008 Australian documentary
- Oasis (2017 film), the pilot episode of an intended British television drama series
- Oasis (2020 film), a Serbian drama
- Oasis (2022 film), a Canadian short documentary
- Oasis (2024 film), a Chilean documentary
- Oasis (2026 film), a German drama

=== Literature ===
- Oasis (anthology), a poetry collection published during World War II
- Oasis, a 1996 teen novel by Gregory Maguire
- Oasis, a 1988 novel by Patricia Matthews
- The Oasis, an 1834 anti-slavery gift book by abolitionist Lydia Maria Child
- The Oasis, a 1999 novel by Pauline Gedge
- The Oasis (novel) (1949), by Mary McCarthy
- The Oasis, a 2001 novel by Petru Popescu

=== Music ===
==== Groups and labels ====
- Oasis (1980s band), a short-lived British music group
- Oasis (American band), active in the 1970s
- Oasis (band), an English rock band (1991)

==== Albums ====
- Oasis (Roberta Flack album), 1988
- Oasis, an album by Kitarō, 1979
- Oasis (Eric Marienthal album), 1991
- Oasis (Akinori Nakagawa album), 2005
- Oasis (J Balvin and Bad Bunny album), 2019
- Oasis (Oasis album), 1984
- Oasis (O.C. and A.G. album), 2009
- Oasis (Shirley Scott album), 1989

==== Songs ====
- "Oasis" (Do As Infinity song), 2000
- "Oasis" (Roberta Flack song), 1988
- "Oasis" (Amir song), 2015
- "Oasis" (Gackt song), 2000
- "Oasis", a song by Amanda Palmer from Who Killed Amanda Palmer
- "Oasis", a song by Exo from Don't Mess Up My Tempo
- "Oasis", a song by the Kooks from 10 Tracks to Echo in the Dark (2022)
- "Oasis", a song by Maynard Ferguson from New Vintage
- "Oasis", a song by Relient K from Forget and Not Slow Down

=== Television ===
- Oasis (British TV series), a 1993 drama series set in South London
- Oasis (South Korean TV series), a 2023 series
- Oasis (2017 film), a pilot episode of an intended British drama series
- "Oasis" (Not Going Out), a 2025 episode
- "Oasis" (Star Trek: Enterprise), a 2002 episode
- Astro Oasis, a Malaysian television station
- Oasis HD, former name of the Canadian English language specialty channel Love Nature

=== Other uses in arts, entertainment, and media ===
- Oasis (festival), annual cultural festival of BITS, Pilani
- Oasis (Minecraft clone), AI-run version of Minecraft
- Oasis (video game), for Microsoft Windows
- KOAS or The Oasis, a radio station in Las Vegas

== Brands and enterprises ==
- Oasis (drink), a non-carbonated bottled soft drink, a product of Orangina Schweppes
- Oasis (horticulture), a brand of foam used in flower arranging
- Oasis (hotel and casino), Mesquite, Nevada, U.S.
- Oasis (spa), a New York City Day Spa founded in 1998
- Oasis Drive-In, a restaurant in Caledonia, Ontario Canada
- OASIS International, an international American water product manufacturer
- OASIS International Hospital, a private hospital in Beijing, China
- Oasis Leisure Centre, a swimming pool and leisure complex in Swindon
- Oasis Mall, Saudi Arabia
- Oasis Restaurant, Texas, U.S.
- Oasis Shopping Centre, Australia
- Oasis Stores, a chain of clothes shops
- Oasis Terraces, an integrated development in Punggol, Singapore

== Computing and technology ==
- OASIS (organization), an information technology standards consortium
- Oasis (software), a surveillance tracking program
- Open Access Same-Time Information System, an electric power transmission management system
- Open Architecture System Integration Strategy, the philosophy behind the Apple Macintosh computer
- Open Artwork System Interchange Standard, an integrated circuit design layout computer file format
- OASIS operating system, an operating system developed and distributed in 1977

== Organisations ==
- The Oasis Center for Women and Girls, a U.S national educational organization
- Oasis Charitable Trust, a UK-based Christian charity
- Oasis Commission, a ministry of the Episcopal Church to LGBT people
- Oasis International Foundation, a center for religious studies in Italy

== Transport ==
- Illinois Tollway oasis, a type of highway rest area
- Isuzu Oasis, a minivan
- Oasis of the Seas, a 2009 Royal Caribbean cruise ship
- Oasis Airlines, a defunct Spanish-based company
- Oasis Hong Kong Airlines, a long-haul Asian airline
- Oasis LRT station, a light rail station in Singapore

== Medicine ==
- Obstetric anal sphincter injuries

== See also ==
- OASYS (disambiguation)
- CREB3L1, a binding protein also known as OASIS
