= OB =

OB, O.B., or Ob may refer to:

== Arts and entertainment ==
- Ob, a fictional currency in The Great Explosion
- Sam "O.B." O'Brien, a fictional character in the British soap opera Hollyoaks

== Businesses and organizations ==
- Astrakhan Airlines (IATA code) (defunct)
- Boliviana de Aviación (IATA code)
- Odense Boldklub, a Danish football club
- Oriental Brewery, a South Korean brewery, which produces the OB lagers
- Oromia Bank, a private bank based in Ethiopia
- Outward Bound, an international outdoor education organization

== People ==
- Ed O'Bradovich, an American former professional football player, known as "OB"
- Old Badmintonians, former pupils of Badminton School, Bristol, England
- Old Bedfordians, former pupils of Bedford School, England
- Old Bristolians, former pupils of Bristol Grammar School, England

== Places ==
- Gulf of Ob, a bay of the Arctic Ocean in Northern Russia
- Ob (river), a river in West Siberia, Russia
  - Ob Sea, an artificial lake on the river Ob
- Ob, Germany, in Bidingen, Bavaria, Germany
- Ob, Russia, a town in Novosibirsk Oblast, Russia
- Ocean Beach, San Diego, a neighborhood of San Diego, California, United States

== Science and technology ==
- OB star, in astronomy, a hot, massive star of spectral types O or B
- Ob, a class of objects in category theory
- Object Manager (Windows), a Windows NT subsystem
- Obstetrics, a medical specialty dealing with childbirth, often used in "obstetrics and gynaecology" (abbreviated OB/GYN)
- Oligonucleotide/Oligosaccharide DNA-Binding-fold domain
- Organizational behavior, an academic field
- Outside broadcasting, a television broadcasting from a mobile television studio, such as a van

== Other uses ==
- Halfpenny (British pre-decimal coin), from "ob", archaic abbreviation
- ob., died, from Latin obitus
- o.b. (brand), a brand of feminine hygiene products
- Order of battle
- Order of Burma
- Organizational behavior
- "Over-the-counter bulletin board", in stock listings
- Ouroboros (Marvel Cinematic Universe), aka "O.B.", a character in the TV series Loki
- "Out of bounds", an area outside the course play area, in golf

== See also ==
- Obese Records, a former Australian record label, founded as a record store in Melbourne called O.B.'s
- Obi (disambiguation)
- Obie (disambiguation)
- OOB (disambiguation)
- Old Babylonian (disambiguation)
