= That Day =

That Day may refer to:

- That Day (film), a 2003 French film.
- "That Day" (Natalie Imbruglia song), 2001
- "That Day" (One Buck Short song), 2003
- That Day: Pictures in the American West, a 2015 book by American photographer Laura Wilson
