= Omps =

Omps may refer to:

- Omps, Cantal, a commune in the French department of Cantal
- Omps, West Virginia, an unincorporated community
- Ozone Mapping and Profiler Suite, a suite of instruments measuring stratospheric ozone distribution

== See also ==
- OMP (disambiguation)
