= 0J =

0J (zero J) or 0-J may refer to:

- January 0 (abbreviation "0J")
- 0 junction power bonds in a Bond graph (abbreviation "0J")
- Zero jump, a type of Turing jump (abbreviation "0J")

== See also ==
- OJ (disambiguation)
- J0 (disambiguation)
