= Own It (disambiguation) =

"Own It" is a 2019 song by Stormzy featuring Ed Sheeran and Burna Boy.

Own It may also refer to

- "Own it", to take ownership or responsibility

== Music ==
- Own It (album), a 2018 album by Francesca Battistelli
- "Own It" (Rico Nasty song), a 2020 single by Rico Nasty off the album Nightmare Vacation
- "Own It", a 2018 song by Ella Mai, off the self-titled album Ella Mai
- "Own It", a 2013 song by Drake, off the album Nothing Was the Same
- "OwNiT" (DJ Premier and Bumpy Knuckles song), a 2012 song off the album Kolexxxion

== Other uses ==
- Own It (Need for Speed), a videogame mode found in the 2009 game Need for Speed: Nitro
- Own It (comics), a 5-part 2016 story arc from the comic book Buffy the Vampire Slayer Season Ten
- Own It Tour, a 2019 USA-wide series of talks about self-acceptance and body image conducted by Sports Illustrated swimsuit model Camille Kostek
- OwnIt Mortgage Solutions, a financial services company that went defunct in the Great Rececssion

== See also ==
- OWN (disambiguation)
- It (disambiguation)
- Information technology (own IT: local tech, internal IT department)
