= OBS =

OBS or obs. may refer to:

== Organisations ==
- Office of Boating Safety, the division of Transport Canada responsible for boating safety
- Optus Broadband Satellite, a satellite broadband service offered by the Australian ISP Optus
- Orange Belt Stages, a bus company based in California, US
- Orange Business Services, a worldwide business communications company
- Organization for Black Struggle, an activist organization in St. Louis, Missouri, US
- Coop Obs!, a chain of hypermarkets in Norway, formerly known as Obs
- Océ Business Services, the outsourcing business of Océ
- ORF-Beitrags Service, a statutory corporation in Austria that collects the TV licence fee

== Education ==
- Oporto British School, a school in northern Portugal
- Outward Bound School; See Outward Bound
  - Outward Bound Singapore, part of the network of Outward Bound centres
- Overbrook School for the Blind, a school in Philadelphia, Pennsylvania, United States

== Science and technology ==
- Organic brain syndrome, a medical condition resulting from brain injury
- Omnidirectional bearing selector, an aircraft navigation instrument; See VHF omnidirectional range
- Obstetrics and gynaecology, commonly abbreviated Obs/Gyn
- Ocean-bottom seismometer, a seismic tool to record earthquakes underwater
- Old Body Style, a colloquial name for the fourth generation Chevrolet C/K /GMC Sierra pickup truck (GMT400) manufactured between 1988 and 2000

=== Computing ===
- OBS Studio, an open source streaming and recording program
- Open Build Service, a software distribution development platform
- Optical burst switching, a switching technology in optical networks

== Television, film, and music ==
- One Buck Short, a punk-rock band from Kuala Lumpur, Malaysia
- "Orange Blossom Special" (song), bluegrass song written by Ervin T. Rouse

=== Broadcasters ===
- OBS (South Korean broadcaster), a broadcast television station based in Bucheon, Gyeonggi-do, South Korea
- Oita Broadcasting System, a radio and television broadcaster in Ōita Prefecture, Japan
- Olympic Broadcasting Services, an organization responsible for the broadcast of the Olympic Games since 2010 Vancouver Winter Games

=== Publications ===
- OBS! (magazine), Swedish business and political magazine
- L'Obs, French news magazine
- On Basilisk Station, the first novel in David Weber's Honor Harrington series

== Business ==
- Off-balance-sheet, financing activity not on the company's balance sheet
- Organisation breakdown structure, a global hierarchy that represents the different levels of responsibility within a project or enterprise

== Other uses ==
- Original British Standard, a bullhead rail profile

== See also ==
- OBSS (disambiguation)
