= OSM =

OSM may refer to:

== Software and websites ==
- OpenStreetMap, an open source project to develop free geographic data
- Open Service Mesh, a free and open source cloud native service mesh

== Organizations ==
- Austrian Student Mission (Österreichische Studentenmission)
- Office of Surface Mining, a branch of the US Department of the Interior
- OSM TV, a Bosnian commercial television channel
- Montreal Symphony Orchestra (Orchestre Symphonique de Montréal), a Canadian symphony orchestra

== Science ==
- Oncostatin M, a protein
- Osmole (unit), a unit of osmotic concentration
- Osmotic avoidance abnormal protein, for example OSM-9

== Transportation ==
- Honda OSM, a 2008 Japanese concept sports car
- Mosul International Airport, Iraq, IATA airport code
- OS-M, a series of space launch rockets from OneSpace

== Other uses ==
- Operational Service Medal (disambiguation), multiple campaign medals
- Order of the Secret Monitor, an appendant order of Freemasonry
- O.S.M., the post-nominal letters used by members of the Servite Order
- OSM Worldwide, a parcel delivery service
- One Saturday Morning, a former Saturday morning cartoon block on ABC
