= J0 =

J0 may refer to:

- $j_0$, Zeroth order Bessel function of the first kind
- Yo, often written as j0 in Leet
- J00 (disambiguation)

== See also ==
- JO (disambiguation)
- 0J (disambiguation)
