= Oji =

Oji, Ōji or OJI may refer to:

== People ==
- Chibuzor Oji (born 1977), stage name Faze, Nigerian musician and actor
- Geoffrey Oji, Nigerian singer and songwriter, winner of the seventh season of Project Fame West Africa
- Megumi Ōji (born 1975), Japanese actress
- Sam Oji (1985–2021), English footballer
- Oji Umozurike, Nigerian law professor, activist and former chairman of the African Commission on Human and Peoples' Rights
- Tshi, also called Oji, a group of tribes in Ghana

== Places ==
- Ōji, Nara, a town in Nara Prefecture, Japan
  - Ōji Station (Nara), a railway station
- Ōji Station (Tokyo), a railway station
- O-J-I, also called Oji, a mountain in Baxter State Park, Maine, United States

== Other uses ==
- Oji Paper Company, a Japanese paper manufacturer
- Open Java Interface
- Ọjị (Igbo for the kola nut), an important component of Igbo culture
- Mochizō Ōji, a main character in Tamako Market, a Japanese anime television series
  - Gohei and Michiko Ōji, Mochizō's parents
