= Timeline of computing 1980–1989 =

This article presents a detailed timeline of events in the history of computing from 1980 to 1989. For narratives explaining the overall developments, see the history of computing.

== 1980 ==
| Date | Location | Event |
|---|---|---|
| 29 January | United Kingdom (UK) | Sinclair ZX80 was released for under £100. |
| 22 May | Japan | The game Pac-Man was released. |
| June | United States (US) | Commodore released the VIC-20, which had 3.5 KB of usable memory and was based on the MOS Technology 6502 processor. Magazines became available which contained the code for various utilities and games. A 5¼" disk drive was available, along with a cassette storage system which used standard audio cassette tapes. Also available were a number of games, a color plotter which printed on 6 in (152 mm) wide paper tape, and a graphics tablet (the KoalaPad). A TV screen served as the monitor. The VIC-20 became the first computer to sell 1 million units. |
| July | US | Tandy released the TRS-80 Color Computer, based on the Motorola 6809E processor and using Microsoft BASIC as its programming language. It was the first Tandy computer to support color graphics, and also supported cartridge programs and games, attempting to bridge both the home computing and video gaming markets. |
| October | US | Development of MS-DOS/PC DOS began. Microsoft (known mainly for their programming languages) were commissioned to write the operating system for the PC; Digital Research failed to get the contract (there is much legend as to the real reason for this). DR's operating system, CP/M-86, was later shipped, but it was actually easier to adapt programs to DOS rather than to CP/M-86, and CP/M-86 cost $495. As Microsoft did not have an operating system to sell, they bought Seattle Computer Product's 86-DOS which had been written by Tim Paterson earlier that year (86-DOS was also known as QDOS, Quick & Dirty Operating System; it was a more-or-less 16 bit version of CP/M). The rights were actually bought in July 1981. It is reputed that IBM found over 300 bugs in the code when they subjected the operating system to scrutiny and re-wrote much of the code. Tim Paterson's DOS 1.0 was 4000 lines of assembler. |
| ? | Netherlands; Japan | Red Book on Audio CDs was introduced by Sony and Philips. This was the beginning of the compact disc; it was released in Japan and then in Europe and America a year later. Roland releases the drum machine TR-808 which would end up revolutionizing music of all genres in the 1980s to a more electronic/futuristic sound. The drum machine Linn LM-1, also released in 1980, was the more expensive alternative to the TR-808. It became a staple of 1980s pop music. |

== 1981 ==
| Date | Location | Event |
|---|---|---|
| March | UK | Sinclair ZX81 was released, for a similar price to the ZX80 (see 1980). |
| 8 April | US | Osborne 1 portable computer introduced; the company sold many units before filing for bankruptcy only two years later. |
| 12 August | US | IBM announced their open architecture IBM Personal Computer. 100,000 orders were taken by Christmas. The design becomes far more successful than IBM had anticipated, and becomes the basis for most of the modern personal computer industry. MDA (Monochrome Display Adapter), text only, introduced with IBM PC. MS-DOS 1.0, PC DOS 1.0. Microsoft (known mainly for their programming languages) were commissioned by IBM to write the operating system; they bought a program called 86-DOS from Tim Paterson which was loosely based on CP/M-80. The final program from Microsoft was marketed by IBM as PC DOS and by Microsoft as MS-DOS; collaboration on subsequent versions continued until version 5.0 in 1991. Compared to modern versions of DOS, version 1 was very basic. The most notable difference was the presence of just one directory, the root directory, on each disk. Subdirectories were not supported until version 2.0 (March 1983). MS-DOS was the main operating system for all IBM-PC compatible computers until Microsoft released Windows 95. According to Microsoft, in 1994, MS-DOS was running on some 100 million computers worldwide. |
| September | US | The TCP/IP protocol is established. This is the protocol that carries most of the information across the Internet. |
| ? | US | Richard Feynman proposed quantum computers. The main application he had in mind was the simulation of quantum systems, but he also mentioned the possibility of solving other problems. |
| ? | US | The Xerox 8010 ('Star') System, the first commercial system to use a WIMP (Windows, Icons, Menus and Pointing Devices) graphic user interface. Apple incorporated many of the ideas therein in the development of the interface for the Apple Lisa (see January 1983). |
| ? | US | Symbolics introduced the LM-2 workstation, a Lisp-based workstation based on the MIT CADR architecture. |

== 1982 ==
| Date | Location | Event |
|---|---|---|
| January | UK | Introduction of the BBC Micro, announced in December 1981. Based on the MOS Technology 6502 processor, it was a very popular computer for British schools up to the development of the Acorn Archimedes (in 1987). In 1984 the government offered to pay half the cost of such computers in an attempt to promote their use in secondary education. |
| January | US | Commodore unveils the Commodore 64 at the Consumer Electronics Show in Las Vegas. Built in just two months around the VIC-II Video Integrated Circuit and the SID Sound Interface Device chips, the C64 used the 6510 processor to access 64K of RAM plus 16K of switchable ROM. This "epitome of the 8-bit computer" sold up to 22 million units in the next decade. |
| February | US | On February 1 the 80286 processor was released. It implements a new mode of operation, protected mode – allowing access to more memory (up to 16 MB compared to 1 MB for the 8086). At introduction the fastest version ran at 12.5 MHz, achieved 2.7 MIPS and contained 134,000 transistors. |
| March | US | MS-DOS 1.25, PC DOS 1.1 |
| April | UK | The Sinclair ZX Spectrum was announced, released later in the year. It is based on the Zilog Z80 microprocessor, running at 3.5 MHz with an 8 color graphics display. The Spectrum sold with two memory options, a 16 KB version for £125 or a 48 KB version for £175. |
| May | US | IBM launch the double-sided 320 KB floppy disk drive. |
| July | UK; US | Timex/Sinclair introduced the first computer touted to cost under $100 marketed in the U.S., the Timex Sinclair 1000. In spite of the flaws in the early versions, half a million units were sold in the first 6 months alone, surpassing the sales of Apple, Tandy, and Commodore combined. |
| August | US | The Commodore 64 is released, retailing at US$595. The price rapidly dropped, creating a price war and causing the departure of numerous companies from the home computing market. Total C64 sales during its lifetime (from 1982 to 1994) are estimated at more than 17 million units, making it the best-selling computer model of all time. |
| October | US | MIDI, Musical Instrument Digital Interface, (pronounced "middy") published by International MIDI Association (IMA). The MIDI standard allows computers to be connected to instruments like keyboards through a low-bandwidth (31,250 bit/s) protocol. |
| December | US | IBM bought 12% of Intel. |
| ? | US | Introduction of 80186/80188. These are rarely used in personal computers as they incorporate a built-in DMA and timer chip – and thus have register addresses incompatible with IBM PCs. |

== 1983 ==
| Date | Location | Event |
|---|---|---|
| January | US | Apple introduced its Lisa. The first mass market personal computer with a graphical user interface, its development was central in the move to such systems for personal computers. The Lisa's sloth and high price ($10,000) led to its ultimate failure. The Lisa ran on a Motorola 68000 microprocessor and came equipped with 1 MB of RAM, a 12-inch black-and-white monitor, dual 5¼" floppy disk drives and a 5 MB Profile hard drive. The Xerox Star – which included a system called Smalltalk that involved a mouse, windows, and pop-up menus – inspired the Lisa's designers. |
| January | US; Europe | IBM PC gets European launch at Which Computer Show. |
| March | US | IBM XT released, similar to the original IBM PC but with a hard drive. It had a 10 MB hard disk, 128 KB of RAM, one floppy drive, mono monitor and a printer, all for $5000. |
| March | US | Compaq Portable released, the first IBM PC compatible machine released with an IBM PC compatible BIOS written from scratch. |
| March | US | MS-DOS 2.0, PC DOS 2.0 Introduced with the IBM XT, this version included a Unix style hierarchical sub-directory structure, and altered the way in which programs could load and access files on the disk. |
| May | US | Thinking Machines Corporation formed. |
| May | US | MS-DOS 2.01 |
| September | US | Richard Stallman announces the GNU Project, to create a free software alternative to proprietary Unixes, on Usenet. He works towards this goal over the next years, but GNU's own kernel, the GNU Hurd, is delayed indefinitely and GNU only becomes a complete usable alternative to Unix with the creation of the Linux kernel in 1991. |
| October | US | IBM released the IBM PCjr in an attempt to get further into the home market; it cost just $699. Cheaper alternatives from other companies were preferred by the home buyer, but businesses continued to buy IBM. PC DOS 2.1 (for PCjr). Like the PCjr this was not a great success and quickly disappeared from the market. MS-DOS 2.11, MS-DOS 2.25. Version 2.25 included support for foreign character sets, and was marketed in the Far East. |
| October | US | Microsoft Word software released. |
| November | US | Domain Name System (DNS) introduced to the Internet, which then consisted of about 1000 hosts. RFC 881 (now obsoleted by subsequent revisions) Microsoft Windows is announced. |
| November | US | Turbo Pascal introduced by Borland. |
| December | Serbia | Detailed schematic diagrams for build-it-yourself computer Galaksija released in Belgrade. Thousands were soon assembled by computer enthusiasts. |
| 1983 | US | Borland formed. |
| 1983 | Japan | Epson QX-10 released; first Japanese computer sold in the US. |
| ? | US | Lotus 1-2-3 spreadsheet software launched. |
| ? | Italy | Olivetti M24 was put on sale. This personal computer had good success and was later rebranded by AT&T. |

== 1984 ==
| Date | Location | Event |
|---|---|---|
| January | UK | Sinclair Research announced its first (and only) personal computer aimed to the business market, the Sinclair QL, at an introductory price of £399. The machine was based on the 68008 CPU of Motorola, the low-cost version of Motorola 68000 with 8-bit external bus. The QL (abbreviation of Quantum Leap) did not become a market success, because of quality issues of the first series and due to the Microdrive used as storage medium instead of the much more reliable floppy discs; its development and production later caused serious financial difficulties for the company. |
| January | US | Apple Macintosh released, based on the 8 MHz version of the Motorola 68000 processor. The 68000 can address 16 MB of RAM, a noticeable improvement over Intel's 8088/8086 family. However the Apple achieved 0.7 MIPS and originally came with just 128 KB of RAM. It came fitted with a monochrome monitor and was the first successful mouse-driven computer with a Graphical user interface. The Macintosh included many of the Lisa's features at a much lower price: $2,500. Applications that came as part of the package included MacPaint, which made use of the mouse, and MacWrite, which demonstrated WYSIWYG (What You See Is What You Get) word processing. |
| May | US | Hewlett-Packard release the immensely popular LaserJet printer; by 1993 they had sold over 10 million LaserJet printers and over 20 million printers overall. HP were also pioneering inkjet technology. |
| June | UK | Amstrad CPC was introduced first in Britain, later in other European markets as well. The machine was based on the popular 8 bit Z80 CPU. The mainboard (i.e. the computer itself) and a cassette recorder (Datacorder) were both integrated in the keyboard. The CPC could be bought in a bundle with a monochrome (GT64) monitor for £249 or a colour (CTM640) monitor for £359. The monitor also served as the power supply to have only one plug to connect to the wall outlet. The CPC became very popular in France and Spain, and in Germany where it was marketed by Schneider Rundfunkwerke AG under its own label. In 1985 two further models (CPC 664 and 6128) with built-in 3-inch floppy disc drive were released. |
| August | US | MS-DOS 3.0, PC DOS 3.0 Released for the IBM AT, it supported larger hard disks as well as High Density (1.2 MB) 5¼" floppy disks. |
| September | US | Apple released a 512KB version of the Macintosh, known as the "Fat Mac". |
| End | US | Compaq started the development of the IDE interface (see also 1989). This standard was designed specially for the IBM PC and can achieve high data transfer rates through a 1:1 interleave factor and caching by the actual disk controller – the bottleneck is often the old AT bus and the drive may read data far quicker than the bus can accept it, so the cache is used as a buffer. Theoretically 1 MB/s is possible but 700 kB/s is perhaps more typical of such drives. This standard has been adopted by many other models of computer, such as the Acorn Archimedes A4000 and above. A later improvement was EIDE, laid down in 1989, which also removed the maximum drive size of 528 MB and increased data transfer rates. |
| ? | US | Motorola released the 68020 processor. |

== 1985 ==
| Date | Location | Event |
|---|---|---|
| January | US | PostScript introduced by Adobe Systems. It is a powerful page description language used in the Apple Laserwriter printer. Adopted by IBM for their use in March 1987. |
| March | US | MS-DOS 3.1, PC DOS 3.1 This was the first version of DOS to provide network support, and provides some new functions to handle networking. |
| March | US | Symbolics registered the symbolics.com domain, the first .com domain in the world. |
| April | US | Expanded memory specification, a memory paging scheme for PCs, was introduced by Lotus and Intel. |
| June | US | Commodore 128 was released. Based on a complex multi-mode architecture, this was Commodore's last 8-bit computer. Cost: $299.95 for each of the CPU unit and accompanying 1571 disk drive. |
| June | US | The Atari ST, an inexpensive 8 MHz Motorola 68000-based computer, appeared. Nicknamed the "Jackintosh", after Atari owner Jack Tramiel, it featured 512 KB of memory and used GEM graphical interface from Digital Research. It was priced under US$1,000. |
| June | USSR | Tetris was written by Russian Alexey Pajitnov. It was later released for various western games machines, the crown jewel being its inclusion with Nintendo's Game Boy in 1989. Alexey made nothing from the game, since under the Communist Regime it was owned by the people. However, after the collapse of Communism he was able to move to the US where he now works for Microsoft. |
| July | US | Commodore released the Amiga, based on a 7.16 MHz Motorola 68000 and a custom chipset. It was the first home computer to feature pre-emptive multitasking operating system. It used a Macintosh-like GUI. Cost: US$1,295 for a system with a single 880 KB 3.5 in disk drive and 256 KB of RAM. |
| September | UK | Amstrad introduced Amstrad PCW 8256/8512, an 8 bit, Z80 based computer system with 256 or 512 KB of RAM, dedicated to word processing and promoted as the alternative of electronic typewriters. PCW was the abbreviation of personal computer for word processing (or personal computer word processor). 8 million PCWs were sold until 1998 when Amstrad discontinued this range of computers. |
| 17 October | US | 80386 DX released. It supports clock frequencies of up to 33 MHz and can address up to 4 GB of memory (and in theory virtual memory of up to 64 TB, which was important for marketing purposes). It also includes a bigger instruction set than the 80286. At the date of release the fastest version ran at 20 MHz and achieved 6.0 MIPS. It contained 275,000 transistors. |
| November | US | Microsoft Windows launched. Not really widely used until version 3, released in 1990, Windows required DOS to run and so was not a complete operating system (until Windows 95, released on August 24, 1995). It merely provided a GUI similar to that of the Macintosh. It was so similar that Apple tried to sue Microsoft for copying the 'look and feel' of their operating system. This court case was not dropped until August 1997. |
| December | US | MS-DOS 3.2, PC DOS 3.2 This version was the first to support 3½" disks, although only the 720 KB ones. Version 3.2 remained the standard version until 1987 when version 3.3 was released with the IBM PS/2. |
| ? | Netherlands; Japan | CD-ROM, invented by Philips, produced in collaboration with Sony. |
| ? | US | Enhanced Graphics Adapter released. |
| ? | UK | Meiko Scientific formed. |

== 1986 ==
| Date | Location | Event |
|---|---|---|
| January | US | Apple released another enhanced version of the Macintosh (the Macintosh Plus personal computer) – this one could cope with 4 MB of RAM (for the first time, upgradable via SIMMs) and it had a built-in SCSI adapter based on the NCR 5380. |
| February | UK | Sinclair ZX Spectrum 128 released. It had 128 KB of RAM, but little other improvement over the original ZX (except improved sound capabilities). Later models were produced by Amstrad – but they showed no major advances in technology. |
| April | US | Apple released another version of the Macintosh (the Macintosh 512Ke) equipped with a double sided 3.5 inch Floppy Disk drive. |
| April | UK | On April 7 it was officially announced that Amstrad Plc acquired the computer division of Sinclair Research Ltd including the marketing and development rights of all ZX Spectrum models and the exclusive right to use the well-known Sinclair brand itself. As ZX Spectrum still had 40% market share and CPC also had some 20%, by the merger a very strong player was established in the British home computer market. |
| June | France | LISTSERV, the first automated mailing list management application, was invented by Eric Thomas. |
| September | UK | Amstrad announced Amstrad PC1512, a cheap and powerful PC. It had a slightly enhanced CGA graphics adapter, 512 KB RAM (upgradable to 640KB), 8086 processor (upgradable to NEC V30) and a 20 MB hard disk (optional). To ensure the computer was accessible they made sure the manuals could be read by everyone, and also included DR's GEM desktop (a WIMP system) and a mouse to try to make the machine more user friendly. It was sold in many high street shops and was bought by business and home users alike. |
| September | Netherlands | At the EUSPICO '86 conference the RIPAC was presented, a microprocessor specialized for speech-recognition designed by CSELT, Elsag and manufactured by SGS. It was used for telephone dialogue-based services in Italy. |
| 9 September | US | Compaq Deskpro 386 was released and is the first implementation of the 80386 processor in a computer system for sale to the public. |
| November | US | At Comdex Las Vegas Atari invited Gene Mosher to introduce his touchscreen point of sale graphic user interface with direct manipulation widget toolkit editing, including the Atari ST's 12" CRT with a Microtouch capacitance touchscreen overlay, 320x200 resolution graphics and a 16-color bitmapped display. |

== 1987 ==
| Date | Location | Event |
|---|---|---|
| 2 March | US | Macintosh II and Macintosh SE released. The SE was based on the 68000, but could cope with 4 MB of RAM and had an internal and external SCSI adapter. It offered a high performance PDS interrupt slot which provided some of the first expandability on a Mac. The SE also offered the capability of displaying color with a third-party video card with its new ROM. The Macintosh II was based on the newer Motorola 68020, that ran at 16 MHz and achieved a much more respectable 2.6 MIPS (comparable to an 80286). It too had a SCSI adapter but was also fitted with a colour video adapter. |
| April | US | On April 2 PS/2 Systems were introduced by IBM. The first 4 models were released on this date. The PS/2 Model 30 based on an 8086 processor and an old XT bus, Models 50 and 60 based on the 80286 processor and the Model 80 based on the 80386 processor. These used the 3½" floppy disks, storing 1.44 MB on each (although the Model 30 could only use the low 720KB density). These systems (except the Model 30, released in September 1988) included a completely new bus, the MCA (Micro Channel Architecture) bus, which did not catch on as it did not provide support for old-style 16 bit AT bus expansion cards. The MCA bus did show many improvements in design and speed over the ISA bus most PCs used, and IBM (if no one else) still use it in some of their machines. The PS/2 models were very successful – selling well over 2 million machines in less than 2 years. |
| April | US | MS-DOS 3.3, PC DOS 3.3 Released with the IBM PS/2 this version included support for the High Density (1.44 MB) 3½" disks. It also supported hard disk partitions, splitting a hard disk into 2 or more logical drives. |
| April | US | OS/2 Launched by Microsoft and IBM. A later enhancement, OS/2 Warp provided many of the 32 bit enhancements boasted by Windows 95 – but several years earlier, yet the product failed to dominate the market in the way Windows 95 did 8 years later. |
| June | UK | Introduction of Acorn Archimedes. |
| August | Canada | AD-LIB soundcard released. Not widely supported until a software company, Taito, released several games fully supporting AD-LIB – the word then spread how much the special sound effects and music enhanced the games. Ad Lib, Inc., a Canadian Company, had a virtual monopoly until 1989 when the SoundBlaster card was released. |
| August | US | LIM EMS v4.0 |
| October– November | US | Compaq DOS (CPQ-DOS) v3.31 released to cope with disk partitions >32Mb. Used by some other OEMs, but not Microsoft. |
| 9 December | US | Microsoft Windows 2 released. |
| ? | US | Connection Machine, a supercomputer which instead of integration of circuits operates up to 64,000 fairly ordinary microprocessors – using parallel architecture – at the same time; in its most powerful form it can do somewhere in the region of 2 billion operations per second. |
| ? | UK | Fractal Image Compression Algorithm invented by English mathematician Michael Barnsley, allowing digital images to be compressed and stored using fractal codes rather than normal image data. |
| ? | US | Motorola released the 68030 processor. |
| ? | US | HyperCard software released. |
| ? | US | Commodore released the Amiga 500 and the Amiga 2000. The Amiga 500 was similar to the original Amiga 1000, but in an all-in-one case with 512 KB of RAM and at a lower price. The Amiga 2000 was built in a large PC-style case and included 1 MB of RAM and Zorro II expansion slots. |
| ? | US | VGA released (designed for the PS/2) by IBM. |
| ? | US | MCGA released (only for low end PS/2s, i.e. the Model 30) by IBM. |
| ? | US | The 8514/A introduced by IBM. This was a graphics card that included its own processor to speed up the drawing of common objects. The advantages included a reduction in CPU workload. |

== 1988 ==
| Date | Location | Event |
|---|---|---|
| January | Italy | Foundation of the MPEG group by Leonardo Chiariglione and Hiroshi Yasuda. |
| 16 June | US | 80386SX was released as a cheaper alternative to the 80386DX. It had a narrower (16 bit) time multiplexed bus. This reduction in pins, and the easier integration with 16 bit devices, made the cost savings. |
| July– August | US | PC DOS 4.0, MS-DOS 4.0 Version 3.4 – 4.x are confusing due to lack of correlation between IBM and Microsoft and also the US and Europe. Several 'Internal Use only' versions were also produced. This version reflected increases in hardware capabilities; it supported hard drives greater than 32 MB (up to 2 GB) and also EMS memory. This version was not properly tested and was bug ridden, causing system crashes and loss of data. The original release was IBM's, but Microsoft's version 4.0 (in October) was no better and version 4.01 was released (in November) to correct this, then version 4.01a (in April 1989) as a further improvement. However many people could not trust this and reverted to version 3.3 while they waited for the complete re-write (version 5 – 3 years later). Betas of Microsoft's version 4.0 were apparently shipped as early as 1986–1987. |
| September | US | IBM PS/2 Model 30 286 released, based on an 80286 processor and the old AT bus – IBM abandoned the MCA bus, released less than 18 months earlier. Other IBM machines continued to use the MCA bus. |
| October | ? | Common Access Method committee (CAM) formed. They invented the ATA standard in March 1989. |
| October | US | Macintosh IIx released. It was based on a new processor, the Motorola 68030. It still ran at 16 MHz but now achieved 3.9 MIPS. It could be expanded to 128 MB of RAM and had 6 NuBus expansions slots. |
| November | US | MS-DOS 4.01, PC DOS 4.01 This corrected many of the bugs seen in version 4.0, but many users simply switched back to version 3.3 and waited for a properly re-written and fully tested version – which did not come until version 5 in June 1991. Support for disk partitions >32 MB. |
| ? | ? | First optical chip developed, it uses light instead of electricity to increase processing speed. |
| ? | ? | XMS Standard introduced. |
| ? | ? | EISA Bus standard introduced. |
| ? | US | WORM (Write Once Read Many times) – disks marketed for first time by IBM. |
| ? | US | Adobe Photoshop software created. |

== 1989 ==
| Date | Location | Event |
|---|---|---|
| January | US | Apple Computer released Macintosh SE/30. Like the SE of March 1987 it only had a monochrome display adapter but was fitted with the newer 68030 processor. |
| March | ? | Command set for E-IDE disk drives was defined by CAM (formed Oct. 1988). This supports drives over 528 MB in size. Early controllers often imposed a limit of 2.1 GB, then later ones 8.4GB. Newer controllers support much higher capacities. Drives greater in size than 2.1GB must be partitioned since the drive structure laid down in MS-DOS 4 and even Windows 95 prevents partitions bigger than 2.1 GB. EIDE controllers also support the ATAPI interface that is used by most CD-ROM drives produced after its introduction. Newer implementations to EIDE, designed for the PCI bus, can achieve data transfer at up to 16.67 MB/s. A later enhancement, called UDMA, allows transfer rates of up to 33.3 MB/s. |
| March | US | The Macintosh IIcx released, with the same basic capabilities of the Macintosh IIx but in a more compact half-width case. |
| March | Switzerland | Tim Berners-Lee submitted a memorandum, titled "Information Management: A Proposal" to the management at CERN. The proposal talks of "... a "web" of notes with links (like references) between them ...". Tim Berners-Lee submitted a further proposal on 12 November 1990 which coined the term WorldWideWeb. |
| 10 April | US | 80486DX released by Intel. It contains the equivalent of about 1.2 million transistors. At the time of release the fastest version ran at 25 MHz and achieved up to 20 MIPS. Later versions, such as the DX/2 and DX/4 versions achieved internal clock rates of up to 120 MHz. |
| July-October | US | The Video Electronics Standards Association, an industry consortium of major SVGA card manufacturers, was formed and introduced the VESA BIOS Extensions standard. |
| September | US | Apple Computer Macintosh IIci released based on a faster version of the 68030 – now running at 25 MHz, and achieved 6.3 MIPS. Apple also released the Macintosh Portable – the first notebook computer Mac, which went back to the original 68000 processor (but now ran it at 16 MHz to achieve 1.3 MIPS). It had a monochrome display. |
| November | Singapore | Release of Sound Blaster Card, by Creative Labs, its success was ensured by maintaining compatibility with the widely supported AdLib soundcard of 1987. |
| ? | US | Lotus Notes software launched. |
| ? | US | Open Architecture System Integration Strategy is presented by Apple Computer as the philosophy behind the Mac in marketing beginning in 1989. |
