= Orange juice (disambiguation) =

Orange juice usually refers to the fruit juice obtained from squeezing orange.

Orange Juice may also refer to:

- Orange Juice (band), a Scottish post-punk band
  - The Orange Juice, a 1984 album
- Orange Juice (film), a 2010 Russian comedy film
- Oran "Juice" Jones (born 1957), an American R&B singer
- Concierto de Aranjuez, a composition for classical guitar and orchestra
- "Orange Juice", a song by Melanie Martinez from her 2019 album K-12
- Orange Juice, a fictional orangutan in Life of Pi

== See also ==
- OJ (disambiguation)
