= Obi =

Obi or OBI may refer to:

== People ==
- Obi (name), a list of people with either the surname or given name
- Mikel John Obi (born 1987), Nigerian footballer also known as Mikel John Obi and John Obi Mikel
- Saint Obi (1965–2023), Nigerian actor and film director
- Obi Cubana (born 1975), Nigerian businessman
- Margaret Obi, British judge
- Peter Obi (born 1961), Nigerian politician and businessman
- Obi Toppin (born 1998), American basketball player
- Chido Obi (born 2007), Danish footballer

== Places ==
- Obi, Nasarawa State, Nigeria, a Local Government Area
- Obi, Nigeria, a town and Local Government Area in Benue State
- Obi Islands, Indonesia
  - Obi (island), also called Obira, the largest of the Obi Islands
- Ob (river), Russia, also known as Obi
- 6669 Obi, an asteroid

== OBI ==
- Oak Beach Inn
- Obliteration by incorporation, a concept in sociology of science: when a discovery, or a theory, is no longer directly attributed to its author because it is considered common knowledge
- Ontology for Biomedical Investigations, an international cross-domain ontology effort
- Operation Blessing International
- Optical Borehole Imaging, a system to visually inspect and record images of the walls of a borehole, detecting breakouts and investigating the stratigraphy, or the structure, of the rock in sedimentary, or igneous, geological formations
- Oracle Business Intelligence Suite Enterprise Edition, software owned by Oracle Corporation
- Order of British India
- Orion Bus Industries, formerly Ontario Bus Industries, a bus manufacturer
- Our Boys Institute, a junior chapter of the YMCA in Adelaide, South Australia
- Obi Rideshare, a price comparison app for rideshares and taxis

== Other uses ==
- Obi (sash), a sash worn with a kimono or with the uniforms used by practitioners of Japanese martial arts
  - Obi (martial arts)
- Obi (retail chain), a European home improvement store chain based in Germany
- Obi (ruler), a title among the Igbo people of Nigeria or the central building in an Igbo homestead
  - Obi of Onitsha, traditional ruler of Onitsha
- Obi, another form of the word Obeah
- Obi (publishing), an informational piece of paper or cardboard folded around or over a book or LP record, music CD, video game, or magazine, used in Japan
- Obi (band), a British indie music band from the early 2000s
- Obi Castle, a Japanese castle completed in 1588
- Obi Station, a train station in Nichinan, Miyazaki, Japan
- obi, ISO 639 code for the Obispeño language, an extinct Native American language
- OBI, FAA location identifier for Woodbine Municipal Airport (New Jersey)

== See also ==
- Obi Obi, Queensland, Australia, a suburb of Gold Coast
- Obi-Wan Kenobi, fictional character from the Star Wars universe
- Oobi, a children's show that aired on Noggin from 2000 to 2005
- Obie (disambiguation)
