= Obi (name) =

- Language: Igbo

Origin
- Meaning: Heart, mind, chest, desire; or, the seat of the homestead
- Region of origin: Igbo land

Obi // is a very common given name and surname of Igbo origin. Igbo being a tonal language, Obi can, depending on its pronunciation, either mean “heart”, “chest”, “desire”, “mind” (Óbì); or describe the central part of the homestead (Òbí) where guests were traditionally received.

== People with this given name ==
- Obi Ikechukwu Charles (born 1985), Nigerian footballer
- Obi Egbuna (1938–2014), Nigerian-born novelist, playwright and political activist in the UK
- Obi Ezeh (1988–2024), American football player
- Obi Melifonwu (born 1994), American football player
- Obi Emmanuel Moneke (born 1983), Nigerian footballer

== People with this surname ==
- Anthony Obi (1952–2022), Nigerian army officer and politician
- Chike Obi (1921–2008), Nigerian politician and mathematician
- Jide Obi (born 1962), Nigerian musician
- Joel Obi (born 1991), footballer
- Margaret Obi, British judge
- Paul Obi, Nigerian military officer and politician
- Peter Obi (born 1961), Nigerian politician
- Zacheus Chukwukaelo Obi (1896–1993), Nigerian leader

== People with this nickname ==
- Obi Toppin (born 1998; first name Obadiah), American basketball player
