= Old Babylonian =

Old Babylonian may refer to:

- the period of the First Babylonian dynasty (20th to 16th centuries BC)
- Old Babylonian language, the historical stage of the Akkadian language of that time

== See also ==
- Old Assyrian (disambiguation)
