= Ose =

Ose or OSE may refer to:

== Places ==
- Ōse, Ehime, a former village in Japan
- Ose, Nigeria, a Local Government Area of Ondo State
- Ose, Norway, a location in Setesdal
- Ose, Poland
- Ose, Skye, a settlement in Scotland
- Öse, a river of North Rhine-Westphalia, Germany, tributary of the Nethe

== Companies and organizations ==
- Ose (band), a French progressive rock band
- Obras Sanitarias del Estado, a state-owned Uruguayan water utilities company
- Hellenic Railways Organisation, Organismós Sidirodrómon Elládos, the state-owned railway company of Greece
- Œuvre de secours aux enfants, a French Jewish humanitarian organization, founded in Russia in 1912, active in Western Europe during World War II
- Osaka Securities Exchange
- Oslo Stock Exchange
- Orquesta Sinfónica de Euskadi, Basque National Orchestra
- Order of Saint Elisabeth
- Order of the Star in the East
- Organosi Sosialistiki Epanastasi (OSE) or Socialist Revolution Organisation, the former name of Socialist Workers' Party (Greece)

== Science and technology ==
- -ose, a suffix used in chemistry to indicate a sugar
- Office Server Extensions for Microsoft Servers
- OMA Service Environment
- Open Source Ecology, a group that develops open-source hardware
- OPENSTEP Enterprise, NeXT's offering of the OpenStep platform for Microsoft Windows
- Open System Environment, a reference model for Enterprise Architecture
- Operating System Embedded, a real-time operating system created by ENEA

== Other uses ==
- Ose (demon)
- Ose (Osei Kofi Tutu I), King of the Ashanti Empire
- Old St. Edwardian, a person who attended St Edward's School, Oxford
