= Middle Assyrian =

Middle Assyrian refers to the Middle Assyrian period of the Ancient Near East, ca. 16th to 10th centuries BC (the Late Bronze Age). It may refer to:

- The Middle Assyrian Empire
- The Middle Assyrian language
- Middle Assyrian cuneiform, see Cuneiform script

== See also ==
- Old Assyrian (disambiguation) (Middle Bronze Age)
- Neo-Assyrian (Early Iron Age)
