= OCN =

OCN is a three letter abbreviation that stands for:

- OCLC Control Number, a bibliographic record identifier
- Ocean Conservation Namibia
- In Oncology nursing, an Oncology Certified Nurse
- Opaskwayak Cree Nation
- Open College Network, a UK education organisation today known as NOCN
- Open Computer Network, a major Internet Service Provider in Japan
- Orange County Newschannel, a defunct cable television news network targeted toward Orange County, California
- Original Camera Negative, the film stock used in a movie camera
- Orion Cinema Network, a South Korean television network
- Orthodox Christian Network
- Originally called number, in telephony, the phone number of the originally called party, regardless of call redirection; look inside a Signalling System No. 7 (SS7) ISDN User Part (IUP) initial address message (IAM) for this optional parameter
- Operating Company Number, in telephony, a code used in various iconectiv telephony products, a major subset of which equate to Company Codes assigned by the National Exchange Carrier Association (NECA) to telecommunications carriers (including landline, wireless carriers, and resellers of various types).
- Order confirmation number, a method for recording purchase orders in many Enterprise resource planning (ERP) systems

OCN may also refer to:

- The chemical formula for a cyanate ion
- The NYSE Symbol for Ocwen Financial Corporation
- The IATA airport code for Oceanside Municipal Airport
- The ICAO airline designator for Discover Airlines
