= OMA =

OMA or Oma may refer to:

== Businesses ==
- Office for Metropolitan Architecture, architecture firm founded by Dutch architect Rem Koolhaas
- Oswalds Mill Audio (OMA), a lifestyle company manufacturing horn loudspeakers and high end audio equipment
- Orchard Mead Academy (OMA), an academy in Leicestershire UK

== Communication ==
- OMA (time signal), a former Czech longwave call sign
- .oma, extension for files encrypted by OpenMG Audio for Sony's ATRAC3 format
- Open Mobile Alliance, a standards body for the mobile phone industry
- Optical modulation amplitude, an optical communication term
- Outdoor Media Association, the peak industry body representing the Out-of-Home advertising industry in Australia
- Outlook Mobile Access, a mobile phone email program using Microsoft Exchange Server

== Engineering ==
- Operational Modal Analysis, a form of modal analysis which aims at identifying the modal properties of a structure based on vibration data collected when the structure is under its operating conditions

== Entertainment ==
- OMA Awards, awards created by MTV
- Oma Ichimura (born 1977), Japanese voice actor
- Oma Irama Penasaran, an Indonesian film released in 1976
- Oma Marilyn Anona (born 1986), Nigerian multi-media personality
- One Man Army (band), a California punk rock band formed in 1996
- Only Men Aloud!, young Welsh male voice choir

== Fictional characters ==
- Oma Desala, a character in the television series Stargate SG-1
- Ōma Kurogane (黒鉄 王馬, Kurogane Ōma), a character in Japanese light novel series Chivalry of a Failed Knight
- Kokichi Ōma (王馬 小吉, Ōma Kokichi), a character in the video game Danganronpa V3: Killing Harmony
- Shu Ouma (桜満 集, Ōma Shū), a character and protagonist in the Japanese anime television series Guilty Crown
- Ohma Tokita (十鬼蛇 王馬, Tokita Ōma), a character and main protagonist from the Japanese manga series Kengan Ashura
- Ohma Zi-O (オーマジオウ, Ōma Jiō), alternately spelled Oma Zi-O, a character and the main antagonist of the 29th season of the Kamen Rider Series, Kamen Rider Zi-O

== Medicine ==
- Ontario Medical Association, a professional organization for physicians in Ontario, Canada
- Opsoclonus Myoclonus Ataxia, a neurological disorder also known as Opsoclonus myoclonus syndrome
- Otitis media acuta, an acute infection of the middle ear

== Places ==
- Ōma, a town in Aomori Prefecture, Japan
- Oma, Mississippi, an unincorporated community in Lawrence County
- Ōma Nuclear Power Plant, in Japan
- Oma, Russia, a village in Nenets Autonomous Okrug
- Oma River, Nenets Autonomous Okrug, Russia
- Oma, Wisconsin, a town in Iron County
- Oman, IOC country code OMA

== Transportation ==
- Eppley Airfield, northeast Omaha, Nebraska, by IATA airport code
- Grupo Aeroportuario Centro Norte, a Mexican airport operating company, by Mexican stock market ticker symbol
- Omaha (Amtrak station), station code
- ICAO designator for Oman Air, an Omani airline

== Other uses ==
- Cyclone Oma, impacted Vanuatu, New Caledonia and the Solomon Islands in 2019
- Object Management Architecture, a vision for the component software environment
- Office of Multicultural Affairs, an Australian Government agency from 1987 to 1996
- Oklahoma Military Academy, from 1919 to 1982, the former name of Rogers State University in Claremore, Oklahoma
- Olympic Moustakbel d’Arzew, an Algerian football team
- Open Mashup Alliance, an industry group for enterprise mashups
- Orlando Museum of Art, an art museum in Orlando, Florida
- Orthologous MAtrix, a database of orthologous genes across multiple species
- Orderly marketing arrangement, a quantitative trade barrier
