= OTW =

OTW may refer to:

- "OTW" (DJ Luke Nasty song), 2016
- "OTW" (Khalid, Ty Dolla Sign and 6lack song), 2018
- Ones to Watch, an American music blog
- Organization for Transformative Works, a non-profit fan activist organization
- Ottawa language (ISO 639-3 language code)
- Meyers OTW, an American training biplane built by the Meyers Aircraft Company from 1936 to 1944
- Opérateur de transport de Wallonie (Transport Operator of Wallonia), a transport operator in Wallonia, Belgium.
- "Otw", a song by Nettspend featuring Xaviersobased, 2023

== See also ==
- Off the Wall (disambiguation)
