= OGD =

OGD may refer to:

- 8-oxoguanine deaminase (8-OGD), an enzyme
- Oesophagogastroduodenoscopy, a diagnostic endoscopic procedure
- Ogden-Hinckley Airport (IATA airport code), Ogden, Utah, United States
- Organization and Guidance Department, an organizational committee of the Workers' Party of Korea, the ruling party of North Korea
- Open government data
- OGD Pictures, a Nigerian film company founded by Tade Ogidan
