= OMP =

OMP may refer to:

- OMP Racing, an Italian manufacturer of racing car equipment
- Ontario Model Parliament, a model parliament for high school students in Canada
- OpenMP, an application programming interface
- Oregon Mozart Players, a professional chamber orchestra based in Eugene, Oregon
- Online marketing platform, an integrated set of web-based marketing tools
- Ośrodek Myśli Politycznej, Polish think tank
- Orthogonal matching pursuit
- Organic micropollutant
- Overlay Management Protocol, network protocol in Cisco SD-WAN products
- Open Monograph Press, an open source publishing platform

== Biology ==
- Orotidine monophosphate, a nucleotide
- Osteoblast milk protein, a milk additive
- Outer membrane proteins, found in the outer membranes of gram-negative bacteria
- Oral Micronized Progesterone
