= OBSS =

OBSS may refer to:

- Orbiter Boom Sensor System, a boom carried on board NASA's Space Shuttles
- Overlapping basic service set (also referred as Inter BSS Collision)
- Outward Bound School of Singapore
- Off Board Sensor Systems, in the List of acronyms: O

== See also ==
- OBS (disambiguation)
