= Ord =

Ord or ORD may refer to:

== Places ==
- Ord of Caithness, landform in north-east Scotland
- Ord, Nebraska, US
- Ord, Northumberland, England
- Muir of Ord, village in Highland, Scotland
- Ord, Skye, a place near Tarskavaig
- Ord River, Western Australia
  - Ord Irrigation Area Important Bird Area
  - Ord River Floodplain, Ramsar Site
  - Ord Victoria Plain
- Ord Township, Nebraska (disambiguation), name of two townships in Nebraska, US
- East Ord, Northumberland, England
- Fort Ord, California, US
- O'Hare International Airport (IATA airport code "ORD", FAA LID "ORD", ICAO airport code "KORD"), an airport in Chicago, US

== Mathematics ==
- Ord, the category of preordered sets
- Ord, the proper class of all ordinal numbers
- ord(V), the order type of a well-ordered set V
- ord_{n}(a), the multiplicative order of a modulo n

== Businesses ==
- Ord Publishing, an imprint of the German group VDM Publishing devoted to the reproduction of Wikipedia content

== Fiction ==
- A prefix for several planets in the Star Wars universe, such as Ord Mantell
- Ord (comics), a Marvel Comics character
- Ord (Dragon Tales), one of the characters in the children's television series Dragon Tales on PBS

== Other ==
- "Ord", a song by Ulver from Kveldssanger, 1996
- Ord (surname)
- Object-relational database
- Odinic Rite Deutschland, renamed Verein für germanisches Heidentum in 2006, a neopagan organisation
- Office of Rare Diseases of the United States National Institutes of Health (NIH)
- Optical rotatory dispersion, a form of spectroscopy used to determine the optical isomerism and secondary structure of molecules
