= OSL =

OSL may refer to:

== Science and technology ==
- Open Shading Language, a shading language
- Open Software License, an open-source software license
- Optically stimulated luminescence, a method of measuring doses from ionizing radiation, which is often used in mineral dating
- Open syllable lengthening, a process by which short vowels become long in open syllables

== Groups, organizations, companies ==
- OSL Group, Hong Kong-based brokerage and digital-assets manager
- Ontario Soccer League, a semi-pro soccer league in Ontario, Canada
- Orchestra of St. Luke's, chamber orchestra in Manhattan, New York City
- Order of Saint Luke, a Methodist religious order
- Oregon Short Line Railroad, a former railroad in the U.S. states of Wyoming, Idaho, Utah, Montana and Oregon
- Oud-Strijders Legioen, a Dutch right-wing organization (1952–2010)
- Sosoliso Airlines, ICAO airline designator

== Events ==
- Ongamenet Starleague, a tournament for professional StarCraft players in South Korea
- Outside Lands, a music and arts festival that takes place annually in San Francsico's Golden Gate Park

== Other uses ==
- Oslo Airport, Gardermoen, IATA airport code
- Osl, a Hungarian gens originating in the 12th century

== See also ==
- OSI (disambiguation)
