= Osis =

OSIS or similar terms may refer to:

== OSIS ==
- Open Source Information System
- Open Scripture Information Standard
- A student council in Indonesia (Organisasi Siswa Intra Sekolah)

== -osis ==
The suffix -osis is used for forming a number of medical terms. The suffix itself signifies only a general functional disorder, but the constructed words are more specific. It is often used to denote a biological process (i.e. Apoptosis, Phagocytosis, Necrosis...)

== Osis ==
Osis (feminine: Ose) is a Latvian language surname meaning "ash" (tree; Fraxinus excelsior).

- Guntis Osis (born 1962), Soviet Latvian bobsledder
- Karlis Osis (1917–1997), paranormal researcher

== See also ==
- OSI (disambiguation) for OSIs, the plural of OSI
