= OASYS =

OASYS may refer to:

== Brands and enterprises ==
- OASys (company), a 100% subsidiary of Webasto
- Accuvue Oasys, a brand of contact lenses

== Computing and technology ==
- Korg OASYS, a workstation synthesizer released in early 2005
- Omgeo OASYS, US financial markets trade confirmation service
- OASys, an acronym for the Offender Assessment System, an IT system used by HM Prisons and the National Probation Service in England and Wales

== See also ==
- Oasis (disambiguation)
