= Obie (disambiguation) =

Obie usually refers to the Obie Award, an off-Broadway theater award.

Obie may also refer to:

== People ==
- Obie Baizley (1917-2000), politician in Manitoba, Canada
- Renaldo Benson (1936-2005), American soul and R&B singer and songwriter
- Obie Bermúdez (born 1981), Puerto Rican Latin pop, salsa singer and composer
- Obie Bristow (1900–1969), professional football player in the early National Football League
- Obie Fernandez, Ruby and Ruby on Rails developer
- Obie Graves, former Citrus College and Cal State Fullerton football player
- Obie Etie Ikechukwu (born 1987), Nigerian footballer who plays as a midfielder
- Bob O'Billovich (also "Obie"; born 1940), east regional scout for the BC Lions of the Canadian Football League
- William Obanhein (also "Officer Obie"; 1924–1994), chief of police for the town of Stockbridge, Massachusetts
- Obie Patterson (born 1938), American politician
- Obie Roberts, Bahamian politician
- Obie Trice (born 1977), American rapper and songwriter
- Obie Trotter (born 1984), American-Hungarian professional basketball player
- Obie Scott Wade, American producer, director and screenwriter
- Obie Walker (1911–1989), professional boxer
- Obie Wilchcombe (1958–2023), Bahamian journalist and politician
- Obelit Yadgar (aldo Obie Yadgar; born 1945), Assyrian-American radio personality
- Young Jessie (Obediah Donnell "Obie" Jessie; born 1936), African American R&B and jazz singer and songwriter

== Other uses ==
- Catch light, a video camera-mounted light also referred to as Obies, invented by Lucien Ballard

== See also ==
- Obi (disambiguation)
