= ODB =

ODB may refer to:

== People ==
- Ol' Dirty Bastard (1968–2004), American rapper and founding member of the Wu-Tang Clan
- ODB (wrestler) (born 1978), Stage name of American professional wrestler Jessica Kresa
- Original David Baker (born 1972), a moniker of American poker player David Baker

== Computers and technology ==
- .odb file extension for OpenDocument format databases
- Object database
- ODB++, a CAD-to-CAM data exchange format used in the design and manufacture of electronic devices

== International relations ==
- Offense–defense balance, a theory concerning the security dilemma

== Military ==
- Operational Detachment Bravo, otherwise known as 'B Team' or Special Forces Operational Detachment Bravo (SFOD B or SFOD-B), a six-man squad of the Green Berets.

== Publications ==
- Our Daily Bread (devotional), Christian devotional booklets produced by Our Daily Bread Ministries
- Oxford Dictionary of Byzantium, a three volume historical dictionary published by Oxford University Press

== Other uses ==
- ODB, the IATA airport code of Córdoba Airport
