= Oasis (spa) =

Day spa in New York City, USA

Oasis Day Spa
- Company type: Limited liability corporation
- Genre: Spa and Retail Product Company
- Founded: New York City, U.S. (1998)
- Founder: Bruce Schoenberg
- Headquarters: New York City, United States
- Number of locations: 3
- Area served: North America
- Products: Bath, Body and Skincare
- Services: Facial, Massage, Body treatment, Manicure, Pedicure and Waxing
- Website: www.oasisdayspanyc.com

Oasis Day Spa is a New York City day spa founded in 1998 that provides services such as waxing, massage therapy, Swedish massage, facials, and prenatal massage. The company also has an offsite massage and pop-up massage program that services the New York metropolitan area and most major US cities. Oasis retails products on their website, including brands such as Dermalogica, Cosmedix, Maximus Clark and Perfect Pearl.

== History ==
Oasis Day Spa was founded in 1998 by Bruce Schoenberg. Schoenberg spent over 20 years in the event marketing and trade show industry. When starting the business, Schoenberg noticed that many spas were only offering massage and skin care services. However, practice of spa-going dates back thousands of years to when people would visit “the waters” for healing. Schoenberg wanted Oasis to be a true “spa,” and thus decided to make water-based treatments a focal point of his business.

Opening just a year after Bliss, Oasis has since expanded to two new locations, and currently employs over 100 people.

== JetBlue ==
In December 2004, Oasis partnered with JetBlue and opened a location in their terminal at John F. Kennedy Airport. When JetBlue moved to their new location in Terminal 5, Schoenberg decided not to continue the relationship.

== Oasis Westchester ==
On November 21, 2008, Schoenberg opened an Oasis location in the town of Dobbs Ferry, located in Westchester County, NY.

== Awards ==
- New York Magazine

Best Massage 2002

- Westchester Magazine

Best New Day Spa 2009
Best Day Spa 2010
Best of the Decade 2000-2010
Best Massage 2012

- American Spa

Best Day Spa 2010
