= OMN =

OMN or omn may refer to:

- Oman, ISO 3166-1 alpha-3 country code
- Oromia Media Network, an Oromo news channel headquartered in Minneapolis, Minnesota, United States
- OMN, the FAA LID code for Ormond Beach Municipal Airport, Florida, United States
- OMN, the IATA code for Osmanabad Airport, Maharashtra, India
- omn, the ISO 639-3 code for Minoan language, Crete
- Ollscoil Mhá Nuad (Maynooth University), university in County Kildare, Ireland.
