= O-J-I =

Coordinates: 45°55′39″N 69°00′53″W

Mount OJI, or O-J-I, is located in Baxter State Park in the U.S. state of Maine, with an elevation of 3419 feet (1042 m). The mountain is named after a rock face which once formed the letters O-J-I, but was mostly destroyed by the Great New England Hurricane of 1938. This is the last in a series of peaks connected to Mount Katahdin and proceeding west from the mountain. On its back side is a large unvisited spruce flat called the Klondike. The elevation of the Klondike is 2900 feet, and it is shaped like a triangle, with O-J-I at its southwestern vertex. Prior to the 1938 hurricane, the shapes of the landslides on O-J-I spelt out OJI. They have become more undistinguished since then.

The principal trees are coniferous: white pine and some red pine, balsam fir, red spruce, jack pine and American yew. Deciduous trees include sugar maple, red maple and moose maple (the only nonoriental stripe-barked maple), paper birch and yellow birch, beech, aspens, bayberry, mountain-ash and black ash. Diapensia and several endemics, including sedges, rhodora and tiny willows are found in these mountains. Flowers include Cornus canadensis, Canadian lily and trillium. Wildlife includes deer, moose, bear, lynx, bobcat, raccoon, fishers, porcupine, brook trout and salmon, as well as birds such as gulls, herons, bitterns, terns, horned and barred owls, bald eagles, red-tailed hawks, Cooper's hawks, hawk owls, grouse and partridge, loons and various songbirds, like the Bicknell's thrush.
