= OPSI =

OPSI may stand for:

- Overwhelming post-splenectomy infection, rapidly fatal septicaemia in a patient who has undergone splenectomy (removal of the spleen).
- Office of Public Sector Information, a UK government body incorporating His Majesty's Stationery Office.
- Open PC Server Integration An open source systems management system with the emphasis on automating software deployment on Windows clients, based on a Linux server.
