= OBJ =

Obj or OBJ may refer to:

== Entities ==
- Ottawa Business Journal, a weekly business publication in Ottawa, Ontario, Canada

== People ==
- Odell Beckham Jr. (born 1992), American football player, nicknamed OBJ
- Olusegun Obasanjo (born 1937), 5th and 12th President of Nigeria, nicknamed OBJ

== Software ==
- OBJ (programming language), a programming language family developed in 1976, including OBJ2 and OBJ3
- U+FFFC ￼ OBJECT REPLACEMENT CHARACTER, a replacement character used in computing

=== Files ===
With the .obj file extension:

- Object file, an organized machine code file created by a compiler
  - Relocatable Object Module Format, an Object file for Intel microprocessors
  - COFF, the object file format on 32-bit and 64-bit Windows
- Wavefront .obj file, a 3D geometry definition file format
