= ONS =

ONS or Ons may refer to:

- ONS (TV channel), Netherlands and Belgium
- Ons Island, Spain
- Ons Jabeur, Tunisian tennis player
- Oberste Nationale Sportbehörde ('Supreme National Sports Authority'), German body now named Deutscher Motor Sport Bund
- Object Naming Service, similar to Domain Name Service (DNS)
- Occipital nerve stimulation, a medical treatment
- Office for National Statistics, UK
- National Office of Statistics (French: Office National des Statistiques), Algeria
- Oncology Nursing Society, U.S.
- One-night stand
- Onslow Airport (IATA code), Australia
- Order of Nova Scotia, a civilian honor
- Original Night Stalker, an American serial killer
- Oulu Nice Soccer, a football club in Finland
