= OCS =

OCS or Ocs may refer to:

== Places ==
- Öcs, a village in Veszprém county, Hungary
- Outer Continental Shelf, a maritime federal land zone beyond the jurisdiction of the United States

== Music ==
- Ocean Colour Scene, an English rock group
- Oh Sees, an American experimental rock band

== Psychiatry and medicine ==
- Obsessive–compulsive syndrome, another name for obsessive–compulsive disorder

== Science and technology ==
- Open Collaboration Services, for integration of web services and communities into desktop and mobile applications, an open and vendor-independent API
- Office of the Chief Scientist (Australia), a part of Department of Innovation, Industry, Science and Research
- Original Chip Set, used in the earliest Commodore Amiga computers
- Carbonyl sulfide, a chemical compound with the formula OCS
- Microsoft Office Communications Server, a software product
- OCS Inventory (Open Computer and Software Inventory), an application which inventories IT assets
- Online charging system, a system allowing providers of communication services to charge customers based on service usage
- Overhead contact system, a system which provides electric power to trains

== Schools and alumni associations ==
- Officer candidate school, a training establishment in many countries where military officers are trained
- Oklahoma Christian School
- Old Cliftonian Society, the society for the alumni of Clifton College, Bristol, England
- Opelika City Schools, a school district headquartered in Opelika, Alabama, United States
- Senator O'Connor College School in Toronto, Ontario, Canada

== Other uses ==
- Ontario Cannabis Store
- Corisco International Airport, IATA airport code "OCS"
- Federation of Old Cornwall Societies or sometimes OCS, a Cornish history charity
- OCS Group, a British facilities management business
- OCS (TV network), defunct French TV network
- Old Church Slavonic, a Slavic language which developed in the 9th century
- Office of Community Services, a US Federal Government agency
- On course side, a term meaning that a sailboat has crossed the start line of a race early
- Operational Combat Series, a game series from The Gamers and Multi-Man Publishing
- Original Chicken Sandwich, a Burger King product

== See also ==
- OC (disambiguation) for the singular of "OCs"
