= Ose (band) =

French prog-electronic band

- Genre: Electronic progressive rock
- Years active: 1978
- Label: Egg
- Past members: Hervé Picart; Richard Pinhas; François Auger

Ose was a 1970s French progressive electronic band formed by Hervé Picart, alongside Richard Pinhas, of the band Heldon, and François Auger.

== Career ==
The group was formed in 1978 by Hervé Picart, alongside the break up of Pinhas' band Heldon. Picart was primarily known as a music journalist, rather than a musician himself. The extent of the group's work was one album, named Adonia.

== Personnel ==
- Hervé Picart – electric & slide guitars, electric organ, synthesizer, bass, composer, & producer
- Richard Pinhas – guitar, synths & sequencer, electronics arrangements
- François Auger – drums

== Discography ==
- Adonia – 1978
