= Off the Wall (disambiguation) =

Off the Wall is a 1979 album by Michael Jackson.

Off the Wall may also refer to:

== Music ==
=== Albums ===
- Off the Wall (Budd Johnson album), 1964
- Off the Wall, a 1978 album by Fat Larry's Band
- Off the Wall, a 1978 album by Ray Wylie Hubbard
- Off the Wall, a 1978 album by Roger Miller
- Off the Wall, a 1980 album by The Ugly Ducklings
- Off the Wall, a 1985 album by Yoshi Wada
- Off the Wall, a 1997 album by John Abercrombie (as Lester LaRue) and Dan Wall
- Off the Wall, a 2012 album by Yuksek
- Off the Wall, concept album of a 'revuesical' by Don Black and Geoff Stephens

=== Songs ===
- "Off the Wall" (Little Walter song), 1953
- "Off the Wall" (Michael Jackson song), 1979
- "Off the Wall", by the Cheetah Girls from TCG, 2007
- "Off the Wall", by Eminem and Redman from the Nutty Professor II: The Klumps film soundtrack, 2000
- "Off the Wall", by NCT Dream from Dreamscape, 2024
- "Off the Wall!", by XXXTentacion and Ski Mask the Slump God from Members Only, Vol. 3, 2017
- "Baby (Off the Wall)", by Sirens from Control Freaks, 2004

=== Other ===
- Off the Wall Studios, a recording studio operated by Robert Venable

== Sports and games ==
- Off the Wall (1984 video game), a 1984 Bally/Sente Technologies arcade game
- Off the Wall (1989 video game), a 1989 video game
- Off the Wall (1991 video game), a 1991 arcade game
- Off the Wall (game), a street game featured in the 2010 documentary film New York Street Games

== Television and film ==
=== Film ===
- Off the Wall (1981 film), a Canadian art documentary by Derek May
- Off the Wall (1983 film), an American comedy starring Paul Sorvino
- Off the Wall, a 1979 short film starring Shane Stanley

=== Television and video ===
- Off the Wall (game show), an American game show that aired on Disney Channel
- Off the Wall (1986 TV series), a 1986 American late-night sketch-comedy show featuring Louise DuArt
- Off the Wall, a 1978 HBO comedy special by Robin Williams
- "Off the Wall" (The Bad Girls Club), a 2009 episode of the TV series The Bad Girls Club
- "Off the Wall", a 1999 episode of the TV series Casualty
- "Off the Wall", a 1991 episode of the TV series MacGyver
- "Off the Wall", a 2011 episode of the TV series Pawn Stars
- "Off the Wall", a 2003 episode of the TV series NYPD Blue
- "Off the Wall", a 1976 episode of the TV series Big John, Little John
- "Off the Wall", a 2005 episode of the TV series Firehouse Tales

== Other uses ==
- Off the Wall (clothing retailer), a Canadian clothing retailer
- Off the Wall Productions, a professional theatre company in Washington, Pennsylvania, U.S.
- "Off the Wall", a slogan used by American apparel brand Vans
- Off the Wall, a radio show hosted by Emmanuel Goldstein on WUSB-FM and the website of 2600: The Hacker Quarterly
- Off the Wall Stage Series, a series of productions by 4th Wall Theatre, Inc. at Bloomfield College, New Jersey, U.S.
- "Off the Walls", poster-sized news publications produced by the Stony Brook Independent, Stony Brook University, New York, U.S.
