= OLS =

OLS or Ols may refer to:

- Oleśnica (German: Öls), Poland
- Operation Lone Star, Texas border operation
- Optical landing system, U.S. Navy landing system
- Order of Luthuli in Silver, a South African honour
- Ordinary least squares, a method used in regression analysis for estimating linear models
- Ottawa Linux Symposium, tech conference held annually from 1999 to 2014
- Oulun Luistinseura, a Finnish multi-sports club
- The Sims 3: Outdoor Living Stuff, the third stuff pack to The Sims 3
- Nogales International Airport (United States), Arizona, US (IATA code)
