= OMR =

OMR may stand for:

- Galería OMR, a gallery in Mexico City
- Ohio Military Reserve, the state defense force of Ohio
- Old Mahabalipuram Road, a transport corridor in Chennai City
- Omani rial, by ISO 4217 currency code
- Optical mark recognition, a data-capture technology
- Optical music recognition
- Oradea International Airport (IATA code)
- Organically moderated and cooled reactor
- Outermost region, a region which is part of a European Union member state, is situated outside of Europe and is fully part of the EU
- OMR, a 2022 album by Omar Rudberg
