= OAC =

OAC or OAc may refer to:

== Organizations ==
- Objectivist Academic Center, an educational institution founded by the Ayn Rand Institute
- Ocean Affairs Council, a government agency of Taiwan
- Ohio Arts Council
- Ohio Athletic Conference, an NCAA Division III athletic conference
- On Athletics Club, a professional group of long-distance runners
- One America Committee
- Online Archive of California
- Ontario Agricultural College
- Ontario Arts Council
- Orange Association Canada, the Canadian branch of the Orange Order
- Orthodox Anglican Church, a denomination of the Continuing Anglican movement in America, part of the Orthodox Anglican Communion
- Orthodox Anglican Communion, a worldwide Continuing Anglican body of which the Orthodox Anglican Church is a part

== Other ==
- Acetoxy group (OAc), a chemical functional group
- Object Action Complex
- Oral anti-coagulant
- Ontario Academic Credit
- Amtrak station code for Oakland Coliseum Station
- Olivetolic acid cyclase, an enzyme
