= OEG =

OEG may refer to:

- Occluded eye gunsight, a type of optical sight
- Oilers Entertainment Group, owners of the NHL's Edmonton Oilers
- Olfactory ensheathing glia, a type of brain cell
- Oliver Ernest Goonetilleke, 3rd Governor-General of Ceylon
- Oberrheinische Eisenbahn, or Upper Rhine Railway Company
