= Osteoblast milk protein =

Milk additive

A pack of Mengniu Milk Deluxe contains OMP, sold for about twice the price of standard milk.

Osteoblast milk protein (OMP, Chinese: 造骨牛奶蛋白) is the name used by Mengniu, a Chinese dairy company, for a milk protein used as a food additive in their Milk Deluxe (simplified Chinese: 特伦苏; traditional Chinese: 特倫蘇; pinyin: Telunsu) since 2005. It is supposed to help the absorption of calcium and promote bone growth in the osteoblasts and prevent osteoporosis.

In February 2009, the safety of OMP was questioned by the General Administration of Quality Supervision, Inspection and Quarantine (AQSIQ), national quality supervision department in China, when they were doing a general clean-up on the use of food additives after the 2008 Chinese milk scandal where melamine was found in some milk products. Mengniu stopped adding OMP to its milk on February 2 after a government order, but did not recall products already on the market. On February 13 the Ministry of Health stated that OMP is "not harmful to human health", but the ban on its use stayed in place because the importer had not submitted the necessary paperwork.

The raw ingredients for OMP were imported from the Tatua Co-operative Dairy Company in New Zealand via Shanghai Tongyuan Food Technology Co. Ltd. (上海统圆食品技术有限公司). Mengniu first stated that the major active ingredient in OMP is Insulin-like growth factor 1 (IGF-1), but later denied adding IGF-1 and said that OMP is the same as Milk Basic Protein (MBP). IGF-1 could possibly cause cancer in extreme doses. The company claimed that the additive is widely used in Europe, the United States and Japan, and had been certified by the New Zealand Food Safety Authority and the U.S. Food and Drug Administration (FDA). However it turned out that the FDA letter referred to a perhaps different additive used by the Japanese Snow Brand Milk Products Company. A director of the Guangdong Dairy Industry Association said that OMP is seldom used in milk products overseas and no conclusion about the impact of OMP on human health has been proven globally. The association may contest any official declaration from the Ministry of Health that OMP is safe.

According to Mengniu and the Ministry of Health, OMP is made from milk by degreasing by skimming and membrane filtration and its major components are lactoferrin and lactoperoxidase.
