= Austrian Student Mission =

Austrian evangelical Christian student movement

ÖSM Logo

The Austrian student mission (ÖSM Österreichische Studentenmission - Christen an der Uni) is an evangelical Christian student movement with affiliate groups on university campuses in Austria. It is a member of the International Fellowship of Evangelical Students.

== History ==
The ÖSM is led by Christian students from a wide variety of backgrounds. They are united in a common desire to "make Jesus Christ known to students in Austria". Each group is also supported by a travel secretary, whose main tasks are encouragement and teaching of various biblical subjects. The ÖSM is not a church and does not want to compete with them, in fact it encourages every member to be a member of a local church.

Activities organized by local ÖSM university groups are for instance bible study groups, talks, book tables or other events like movie nights. Almost every week there is some sort of event. Usually in April they meet together at a retreat in Schloss Mittersill (called 'Forum'), where talks and seminars are held to encourage the group in their Christian faith. Members of the ÖSM groups also participate in international IFES events like the World Assembly and the European Student Evangelism Conference.

== See also ==
- SMD German Student Mission (German Wikipedia)
- UCCF (IFES-Group in Great Britain)
- InterVarsity Christian Fellowship (IFES-Group in USA)
- International Fellowship of Evangelical Students (worldwide umbrella organisation)
- Schloss Mittersill
