= OQ =

OQ may refer to:

- Chongqing Airlines, IATA code OQ
- Queen Air, a defunct airline and previous user of IATA code OQ
- Royale Airlines, a defunct airline and previous user of IATA code OQ
- One Queensbridge, a supertall skyscraper expected to be built in Melbourne, Australia
- Operational qualification, part of Verification and validation
- A part of the V-Model of systems development
- Officier (Officer) of the National Order of Quebec
- Opera Queensland, Australia
- A range of drones, including the Radioplane OQ-2
- Peckett OQ Class of locomotives
- Orienteering Queensland, a state-level sports body in Australia
- OQ (company), an energy investment company headquartered in Muscat, Oman
