= Oasis (software) =

CIA audio software

- Developer: Central Intelligence Agency (Office of Advanced Information Technology)
- Available in: English (Arabic and Chinese reported in development)
- Type: Speech recognition, transcription
- License: Proprietary

Oasis is a piece of software developed by the United States Central Intelligence Agency (CIA) that converts audio signals such as cellphone calls and television and radio broadcasts into readable and searchable text. It is designed to intelligently analyze an audio signal such as a cellphone call in order to identify and label each speaker (Male 1, Male 2, Female 1, and so forth). Oasis is also able to intelligently reference terms, such as by linking "car bomb" with "terrorism".

== See also ==
- Carnivore – a system developed by the US FBI to "wiretap" email.
- ECHELON – a joint signals intelligence network.
- Magic Lantern – a keystroke logging program developed by the US FBI.
- vidby – AI-based translation for videos
- reQall – an app that organizes spoken voice notes
