= Ontario Model Parliament =

Model parliament in Canada

- Abbreviation: OMP
- Formation: 1986
- Type: NGO
- Purpose: Education
- Headquarters: Upper Canada College
- Location: Toronto
- Region served: Ontario
- Official language: English
- Conference Chair: Aleksei Wan
- Faculty Advisor: Mr. Matt Griem
- Affiliations: UCC
- Website: OMP

The Ontario Model Parliament (OMP) was a model parliament for high school students in Ontario, Canada. The OMP was founded in 1986, much through the efforts of Dr. Paul Bennett, a former history master at Upper Canada College in Toronto. The OMP is not affiliated with any political party. OMP was ended after its thirtieth session so that it could be combined with another event to form a larger conference, OMUN.

More than 200 students participate in the OMP each year. The annual OMP commences with an "Elections Day", in which the "government" and "opposition" are established. The delegates then prepare their "legislation" for the legislative sessions held in the spring. The students convene at Queen's Park, the legislative building for Ontario. The students debate their bills as if they were real Members of Provincial Parliament (MPPs). In addition, the delegates hear from keynote speakers. In the past, such speakers have included The Hon. Elizabeth Dowdeswell (Lieutenant Governor of Ontario) in 2015, Kathleen Wynne (Premier of Ontario) in 2014, John Tory (formerly the Leader of the Opposition for Ontario and currently Mayor of Toronto), James Bartleman (formerly the Lieutenant-Governor of Ontario) and Rex Murphy (political commentator and host of Canadian Broadcasting Corporation's Cross Country Checkup). Ontario Model Parliament celebrated its 25th anniversary in 2011.

== Past simulations ==
Ontario Model Parliament
Session	Year	Location	Junior Premier	Senior Premier	Chairs
30	2015	University of Toronto & Queen's Park	Adam Rothman	Kyle Fitzgerald	Aleksei Wan
29	2014	Upper Canada College & Queen's Park	Jordan Samaroo	Conor Healy	Aleksei Wan & Sachin Pasricha
28	2013	Upper Canada College & Queen's Park	Nikhil Kassum	Romeo Tello	Christopher Taylor & Sachin Pasricha
27	2012	Upper Canada College & Queen's Park	Conor Healy	Kaleem Hawa	Ryan Manucha, Malik Ismail, Sebastian Marotta & Shashwat Koirala
26	2011	Upper Canada College & Queen's Park	Lucas Manucha	Kaleem Hawa	Jamie Henderson, Ryan Manucha & Shashwat Koirala
25	2010	Upper Canada College & Queen's Park	Christopher Taylor	Kaleem Hawa	Ali Jutha & Jamie Henderson
24	2009	Upper Canada College & Queen's Park	Taylor Webb	Jeremiah Rivers	John Henderson & Ali Jutha
23	2008	Upper Canada College & Queen's Park	Ryan Manucha	Kyle Crawford	David Marshall & John Henderson
22	2007	Upper Canada College & Queen's Park	Steven Xu	Will Meneray	Emma Groia & David Marshall
21	2006	Upper Canada College & Queen's Park	Jaimie Hildebrand	Olivier Mclean	Emma Groia & Brandon Soeiro
20	2005	Upper Canada College & Queen's Park	Steven Lee	Shamir Dawood	Brandon Soeiro & Zachary Schwartz
19	2004	Upper Canada College & Queen's Park		Chris Horkins	Rahim Bapoo & Brandon Soeiro
18	2003	Upper Canada College & Queen's Park		Farouk Hussein	Mark Salzman & Derrick Leung
17	2002	Upper Canada College & Queen's Park			Chanakya Sethi
16	2001	Upper Canada College & Queen's Park			Ryan Gallagher
15	2000	Upper Canada College & Queen's Park			Jonathan Schachter & Jamie Cameron
14	1999	Upper Canada College & Queen's Park			Sagar Chandaria & Tim Tutsch
13	1998	Upper Canada College & Queen's Park			Martin Ross

== Dates ==
For 2015, the dates for OMP are the following:

- Elections Day: April 7, 2015
- Simulation: April 8–9, 2015

== Governance ==
For 2015, the Ontario Model Parliament Executive included:

- Chairs: Aleksei Wan
- Vice Chair: James Coady
- Director of Academic Programming: Nikhil Kassum
- Director of Registration: Javid Karim
- Director of Communications: Kinton Cheung
- Director of Operations: Shakir Lakhani
- Director of Delegate Services: Miles Hoaken
- Secretary: Matthew Jagdeo
- Head of Press Corps: Derek Lam
- Faculty Adviser: Mr. Matt Griem
