= Oma, Russia =

Human settlement in Zapolyarny District, Nenets Autonomous Okrug, Russia

Oma О́ма
- Interactive map of Oma
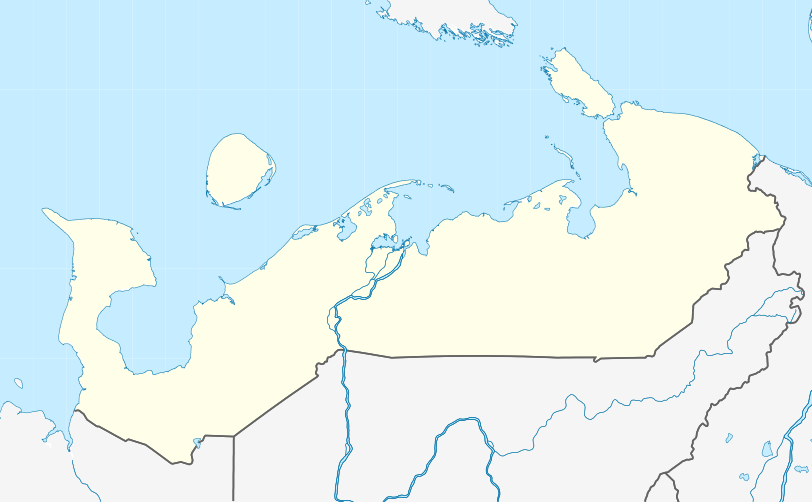
- Location of Oma Oma (Nenets Autonomous Okrug)
- Country: Russia
- Federal subject: Nenets Autonomous Okrug
- Founded: 1858

Population (2010 Census)
  - Total: 763
  - Estimate (2021): 602 (−21.1%)
- Time zone: UTC+3 (MSK)
- Postal code: 166735
- Dialing code: +7 81857
- OKTMO ID: 11811457101

Oma (Russian: О́ма) is a settlement in Zapolyarny District, Nenets Autonomous Okrug, Russia. It had a population of 763 in 2010, a decrease from its population of 795 in 2002.

== Geography ==
Oma is located about 305 km southwest of Naryan-Mar, on the eponymous Oma River.

== Transport ==
From Oma, there is a flight to Naryan-Mar.

== Climate ==
Oma has a subarctic climate (Dfc).
