= OXR =

OXR may refer to:

- OpenXR, an open-source, royalty-free standard for access to virtual reality and augmented reality platforms and devices
- Oxiana Limited (ASX: OXR), a defunct Australian copper and gold miner and exploration company
- Oxnard Airport (IATA: OXR), a county-owned, public airport a mile west of downtown Oxnard, in Ventura County, California
