= Ord Township, Nebraska =

Ord Township, Nebraska may refer to the following places:

- Ord Township, Antelope County, Nebraska
- Ord Township, Valley County, Nebraska
