= OFA =

OFA or Ofa may refer to:

== Organizations ==
- Office of Federal Acknowledgment, an office within the Bureau of Indian Affairs
- Oman Football Association
- Ongerup Football Association
- Ontario Federation of Agriculture, a farmer lobbying organization
- Ontario Football Alliance
- OpenDocument Format Alliance, a Washington, D.C. lobbying organization
- Organizing for Action, an American political group affiliated with the Democratic Party
- Organizing for America, an American political group affiliated with the Democratic Party
- Orthopedic Foundation for Animals, a non-profit organization for researching diseases of animals

== People ==
- Ofa Faingaʻanuku (born 1982), Tongan rugby union player
- ‘Ofa Likiliki, Tongan women's rights advocate
- Ofa Moce, member of the Fiji women's national basketball team
- Ofa Swann, Fijian lawyer
- Ofa Tu'ungafasi (born 1992), Tongan-New Zealand rugby union player

== Places ==
- Ofa Kugbe (Ofagbe), a town in Nigeria
- Ufa, Bashkortostan, Russia

== Other uses ==
- Cyclone Ofa, a 1990 tropical storm
- Ogdensburg Free Academy, a school, New York, US
- Oracle Fusion Applications, software
- OFA (Oxlade From Africa), 2024 album by Oxlade
