= 8-oxoguanine deaminase =

Class of enzymes

Identifiers
- EC no.: 3.5.4.32

Databases
- BRENDA: enzyme data
- ExPASy: NiceZyme view
- KEGG: enzyme entry
- MetaCyc: metabolic pathway
- Rhea: reactions
- PDB structures: RCSB PDB PDBe PDBsum
Search
- PMC: articles
- PubMed: articles
- NCBI: proteins

8-oxoguanine deaminase (EC 3.5.4.32, 8-OGD) is an enzyme characterised from Pseudomonas aeruginosa with systematic name 8-oxoguanine aminohydrolase. It catalyses the hydrolysis of 8-oxoguanine to uric acid and ammonia:

8-oxoguanine
H_{2}O
NH_{3}
uric acid

The enzyme has zinc as Zn^{2+} bound in the active site. 8-oxoguanine is formed by the oxidation of the nucleotide base, guanine, in DNA when it reacts with active oxygen and organisms need to repair that damage. The enzyme oxoguanine glycosylase is responsible for base excision repair, and this enzyme assists by converting the removed base to uric acid for recycling.
