= OSM-9 =

OSMotic avoidance abnormal family member (osm-9) (Caenorhabditis elegans)
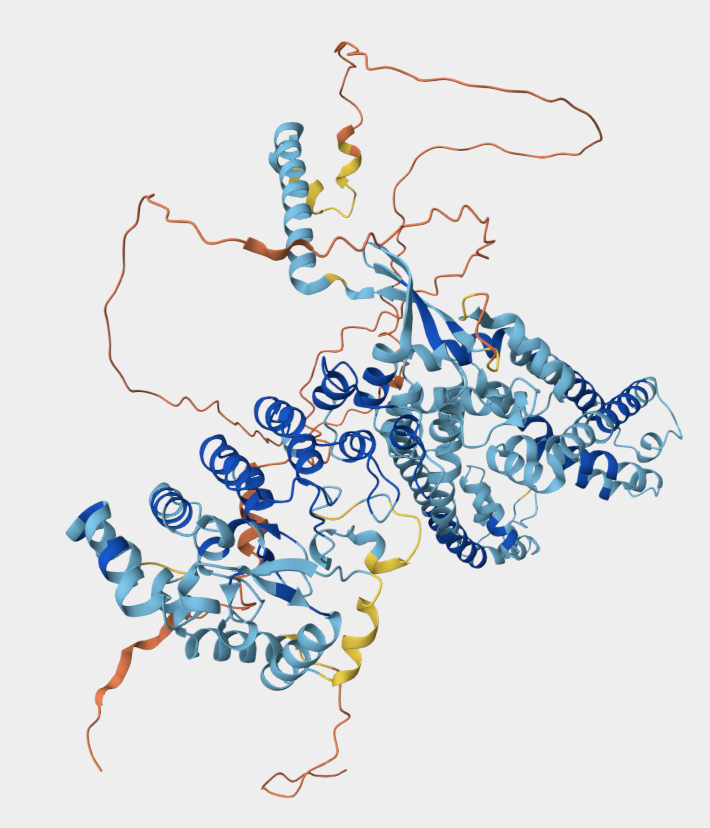
- OSM-9 Structure (Uniprot)

Identifiers
- Organism: Caenorhabditis elegans
- Symbol: OSM-9
- Entrez: 177117
- HomoloGene: 4 TRPV 4
- UniProt: G5EBV8

Other data
- Chromosome: IV: 3.55 - 3.56 Mb
Search for
- Structures: Swiss-model
- Domains: InterPro

OSM-9, also known as OSMotic avoidance abnormal 9, is a transient receptor potential vanilloid (TRPV) channel protein commonly found in the sensory cilia of Caenorhabditis elegans, a type of nematode (roundworm). This group of proteins detect stimuli such as temperature, pH, and certain compounds. The OSM-9 protein is required for some olfactory and osmotic stimuli as well as a mechanosensory response to nose touch. OSM-9 is closely associated with OCR-2, another TRPV channel protein, and sometimes considered subunits of one channel protein due to their frequent co-expression. OSM-9 is the homolog of TRPV4 in mammals.

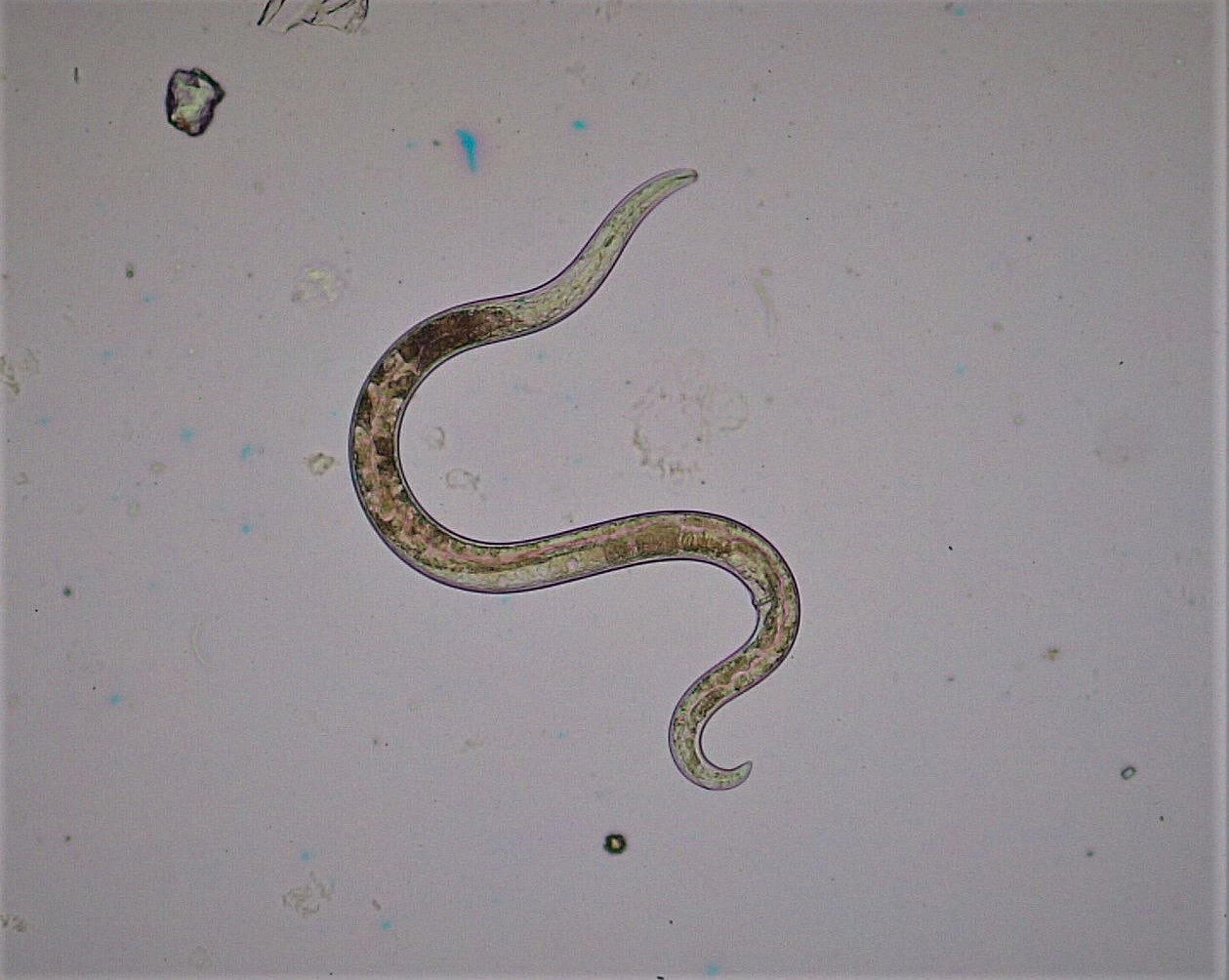
Nematode, species unknown.

== Mechanism ==
When a stimuli is detected, such as a change in temperature, the channel protein changes conformation allowing calcium ions to flow into the cell. This causes depolarization, triggering an action potential and ultimately a signaling cascade which results in a response, such as moving away or towards the stimulus.

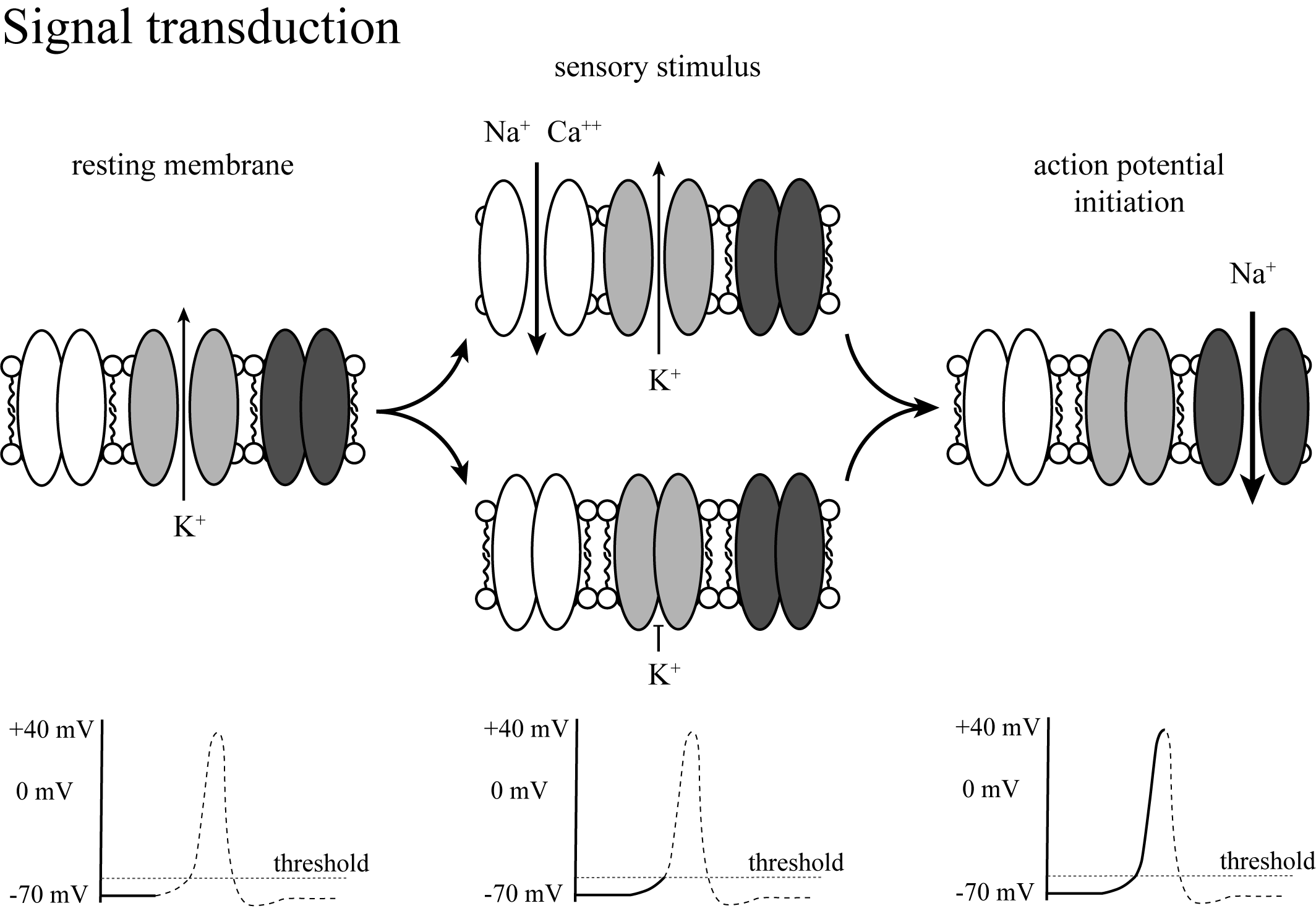
Simplified signal cascade/transduction thematic

== Structure and location ==
TRPV channel proteins are a type of transient receptor potential (TRP) ion channels, specifically within group I of TRP channels. Vanilloids are a family of molecules, an example of which is capsaicin.

TRP Channel Phylogeny

Capsaicin, the molecule that makes peppers spicy

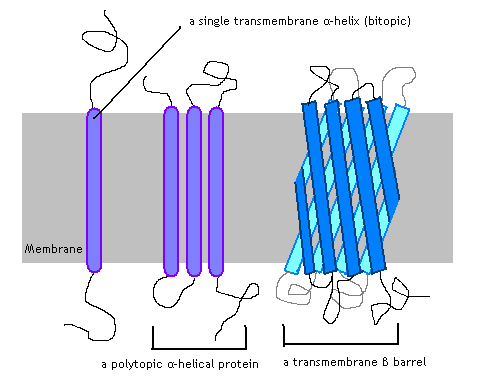
Transmembrane protein types: α-helices and β-sheets

OSM-9 is made up of many α-helices and some β-sheets. It is predicted that it crosses the membrane six times. This indicates hydrophobic non-polar regions that reside within the hydrophobic non-polar cell membrane (phospholipid bilayer) as well as extracellular and intracellular hydrophilic polar regions. This protein encodes a protein with ankyrin repeats.

OSM-9 is found in the cell membrane of C. elegans as a transmembrane protein, spanning the membrane with six transmembrane domains. There is varying data on the length of OSM-9, but 937 amino acids (2,811 base pairs) is the most commonly reported length. This corresponds to a mass of roughly 103.070 kDa and a length of roughly 1405.5 Å (140.55 nm). OSM-9 exists at genomic position 3551090..3557431 in chromosome IV.

Many neurons express both OSM-9 and OSM-2 together. In these neurons, the OSM-9 and OSM-2 proteins enhance localization within the cilia, indicating a mutualistic advantage. In neurons that only express OSM-9, the protein is found in the cell body, acting in "sensory adaptation rather than sensory transduction."

== Function ==
OSM-9 is used in various senses as evidenced by expression of OSM-9 by neurons including ADL (odor detection), OLQ & FLP (touch detection), AWC (odor perception), AWA & ADF (chemical detection), and ASH (pain detection/perception). OSM-9 controls the biosynthesis of serotonin via regulation of the expression of the enzyme tryptophan hydroxylase.

C. elegans Sensory Receptors (hemaphordite)
Function	Express OSM-9	Express other proteins
Chemosensors (taste)	ASH, ADF, PHA, PHB	ASE, ASG, ASI, ASJ, ASK, ADL, IL2
Odorsensors (smell)	AWA, ASH, AWC, ADL	AWB
Oxygen sensors		AQR, PQR, URX, BAG
Nociceptors (pain)	ASH	
Osmoceptors	ASH	
Thermonociceptive	FLP	AFD, PHC, PVD
Thermosensors	FLP, AWC	AFD, PVD, PHC
Mechanosensors	ASH, FLP, OLQ	ALM, AVM, PLM, PVM, IL1, CEP, OLL, ADE, PDE, PVD
Proprioceptors	FLP	PVD, DVA, PVC, ALN, PLN, VA, VB, DA, DB, SMB, SMD, SAA, AVG, PDB, PHC, PVR, ALN, PLN, PLM, I1, I1, I3, I5, I6, MC, M3, NSM
Possible sensory neurons, modality unknown	AUA, URY, URA, URB	

=== Chemical and odor detection ===
"C. elegans is repelled by high osmolarity, heavy metals such as copper, detergents, bitter alkaloids such as quinine, acid pH, and some organic odors." Such signals cause a quick response from ASH neurons, causing the animal to respond by moving away from the unwanted stimulus.

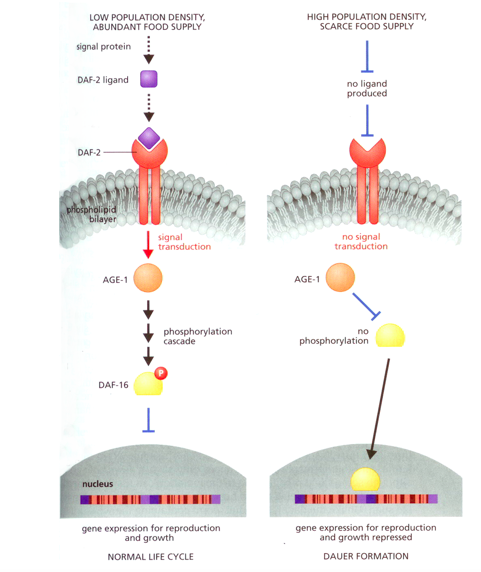
Dauer formation mechanism, occurs in response to harsh conditions

ADF plays a role in response to high salt concentrations as well as Dauer formation, a survival method for C. elegans larva. PHA and PHB work together to sense strong odors and respond by pivoting direction of movement.

AWA is a type of olfactory neuron that detects volatile odors, such as diacetyl, pyrazine, and trimethylthiazole, using OSM-9 and G protein-coupled receptors. Similarly, ADL neurons detect volatile odors such as 1-octanol.

ASH neurons require OSM-9 and are involved in pain tolerance, utilized to detect molecules like capsaicin, the molecule responsible for a pepper's spice/hotness. ASH neurons are also involved in chemical and osmolarity detection.

AWC neurons don't require OSM-9 but have been found to utilize the channel protein in the detection and response to odors, especially during prolonged exposure.

=== Nose touch response ===
Nose touch response, defined as "nose-on collision with an object such as an eyelash," uses mechanosensory neurons ASH, FLP, and OLQ to express OSM-9.

=== Serotonin ===
Chemical structure of serotonin

Serotonin is utilized in C. elegans for many food-related behaviors and has been linked to ADF neurons, among others. ADF neurons utilize OSM-9 and OSM-2 to regulate serotonin production. Some sources also claim ADF synthesizes serotonin.

=== Temperature ===
FLP neurons are one of the thermonociception (to detect and respond to temperature) neurons in C. elegans, however FLP neurons are the only group of thermonociception neurons that express OSM-9.

== Mutations ==
Mutations in OSM-9 causes inability to respond to nose touch while body touch response (involving other neurons encoded by other proteins) remains intact. This indicates the physical isolation of OSM-9 protein channels within the nematode body. OSM-9 mutants are also unable to avoid high osmolarity or harmful odors. The expression of mammalian protein channel TRPV4 did restore the OSM-9 mutants ability to respond properly to nose touch and high osmolarity.

== Related proteins ==
- OSM-2
  - Similar to OSM-9, OSM-2 is a TRPV channel within C. elegans. OSM-9 and OSM-2 are often expressed concurrently, and sometimes even considered to be subunits. Information on OSM-2 is even more limited than OSM-9.
- TRPV4
  - TRPV4, a TRPV protein like OSM-9, is used to sense mechanical, chemical, and osmotic stimuli. TRPV4 is a mammalian protein channel, however, studies have documented the similarity to OSM-9 by expressing TRPV4 in OSM-9 mutants. In these mutants, nose-touch, high osmolarity, and harmful odors were not avoided as in the non-mutants. By expressing TRPV4, the OSM-9 mutants regained the ability to avoid nose-touch and high osmolarity.
- TRPV1
  - The most studied TRPV, TRPV1 is expressed in humans. TRPV1 is a nociceptor, receiving stimulus perceived to be pain and passing that message along to the brain so that the body can take action. TRPV1 is involved in the detection of capsaicin, the molecule that gives peppers their spiciness. While not expressed in C. elegans, the ability to detect pain and the similar channel protein makes TRPV1 worth mentioning in relation to OSM-9.
