= Office of Boating Safety =

Division of Transport Canada

The Office of Boating Safety is the division of Transport Canada that is responsible for overseeing regulations, standards, policies, enforcement, and technical services for pleasure craft and marine recreation. The OBS delivers prevention-based programs to reduce the safety risks and environmental impacts of boating on Canadian waters.

== See also ==
- Pleasure Craft Operator Card - mandatory boater education in Canada
