= Old Assyrian =

Old Assyrian refers to a period of the Ancient Near East, ca. 20th to 16th centuries BCE (the Middle Bronze Age). It may refer to:

- The Old Assyrian Empire
- The Old Assyrian language
- Old Assyrian cuneiform, see Cuneiform script

== See also ==
- Middle Assyrian (disambiguation)
- Neo-Assyrian (Early Iron Age)
