= J00 =

J00 may refer to:

- HMS Bangor (J00), a 1940 British Royal Navy minesweeper

and also:

- You, often written as joo or j00 in Leet
- J00: Acute nasopharyngitis (common cold or rhinitis) ICD-10 code
