= Orthodox Christian Network =

Orthodox Christian Network

The Orthodox Christian Network (OCN) is an American broadcasting network which presents Orthodox Christian themed programming to the United States and to over 190 countries world-wide.

The Orthodox Christian Network is an official agency of the Assembly of Canonical Orthodox Bishops of the United States of America, originally commissioned by (SCOBA), OCN was established to create a sustainable and effective media witness for Orthodox Christians throughout North America. Established in the 1990s, OCN produces a variety of media tools that are aired 24 hours a day, 7 days a week, utilize today’s digital platforms to produce and provide unlimited access to faith-inspiring programming including podcasts, daily devotionals, blog posts, live streaming worship and much more. This include "Come Receive the Light," a nationally syndicated Orthodox radio program and the "RUDDER," a twenty-four-hour internet radio station that features traditional Orthodox liturgical music and chant. OCN not only produces original content but also works in direct collaboration with sister Assembly agencies (e.g., IOCC, OCMC, OCF, OCPM), as well as with various Orthodox Christian jurisdictions and pan-Orthodox, para-church organizations.

In the words of the founder and Executive Director of OCN, Rev. Fr. Christopher Metropulos, "OCN's mission is to bring the Orthodox Faith to the Fingertips of all Orthodox Christians around the world through modern media to communicate the timeless truth of Orthodoxy.”

OCN is not underwritten financially by any one organization, jurisdiction or individual. Rather, OCN is supported entirely by donations, partnerships and grants. The Orthodox Christian Network is a 501 (c) 3 corporation.
