= Orsa =

Orsa or ORSA may refer to:

Places:

- Orsha or Orša, Belarus
- Orsa, Sweden
- Orsa Municipality, Swedish municipality

Vessels:

- Orsa-class torpedo boat, built for the Italian Navy in the 1930s
- Italian training ship Orsa Maggiore (A5323), a contemporary ocean ketch serving as a sail training vessel

Other uses:

- Orsa (moth), a moth in the family Erebidae
- Operations Research Society of America
- Own Risk and Solvency Assessment, in EU insurance regulation
- Oxacillin-resistant Staphylococcus aureus
