= Obie Fernandez =

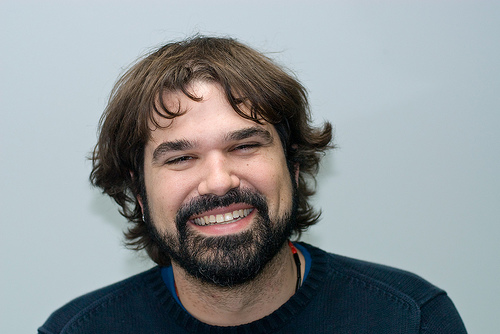
Obie Fernandez

Obie Fernandez is a Ruby and Ruby on Rails developer from Georgia He has authored The Rails Way and has become the editor of Addison-Wesley's Professional Ruby series. His vocal advocacy of Ruby over Java has garnered wide criticism. He was one of the cofounders of Hashrocket, a company offering Ruby development services.
