= OMB =

OMB or omb may refer to:

== Organizations ==
- Office of Management and Budget, the largest office within the Executive Office of the President of the United States
- OMB, a graphic design studio founded by Oscar Mariné
- Ontario Municipal Board, an independent administrative board in the province of Ontario, Canada
- Optical Media Board, a national agency under the Office of the President of the Philippines
- Oregon Marching Band, the marching band of the University of Oregon
- Oregon Medical Board, state agency responsible for establishing the rules and regulations for medicine

== Other uses ==
- East Ambae language (ISO 639-3 code: omb), an Oceanic language spoken on Ambae, Vanuatu
- Olympiade Mathématique Belge, a mathematical competition for students in grades 7 to 12
