= OCO =

OCO or Oco may refer to:

- Oco, a town in Navarre, Spain
- The Oakland Coliseum, formerly branded O.co Coliseum, in California, US
- Old Cornish, a language (ISO 639-3 code: oco)
- Oort cloud object, a distant body of the Solar System
- Orbiting Carbon Observatory 2, a 2014 NASA satellite
  - Orbiting Carbon Observatory, lost to a launch vehicle failure in 2009
- Overseas contingency operation, a type of US military operation
- o.co, Overstock.com, an online store
- One cancels other, a type of financial trading instruction
- O=C=O, the structural formula for carbon dioxide
- Offensive cyber operations, a US Air Force term
