= Oji Umozurike =

- Citizenship: Nigeria
- Known for: Human Rights
- Scientific career
- Workplaces: Abia State University

Oji Umozurike is a Nigerian scholar, activist and a former chairman of the African Commission on Human and Peoples' Rights, an organ of the inoperative Organisation of African Unity. He is currently a professor of law at the Abia State University.

== Human Rights ==
Prof Oji Umozurike was a commissioner of the African Human Rights Commission from 1989 to the mid-1990s. As a member of the commission, he worked hard in promoting human rights in the continent. He tried to institute a public day of support and celebration on human rights of Africans across the continent and the promotion of human rights education in Schools, he was also open and fair in its duties, visiting all countries assigned to him as commissioner including speaking in Ghana during the inauguration of its independent Commission on Human Rights. However, he was less critical on matters affecting municipal restriction of human rights of Africans, mostly because he favoured a balance between the local human right laws and the African and International human rights norms. Nevertheless, this was partly a legacy of the organisation. When OAU was formed in the 1960s, inclusive in its mission was to respect the sovereignty of members against international manoeuvres, this was due to the rise in nationalism and campaign against racism during the period. Since then, the organisation for a large part of its existence before it became defunct favoured less promotion of overriding and binding regional or international laws on its members. Due to its mission and because of the mindset of member states to hold on their national laws, the commission was severely criticised as incapable of promoting human rights in Africa. Umozurike's view during his tenure was not far from the organisation's desire, he held the belief that the commission's human rights charter though powerful is merely a paper tiger, as discretionary powers still concentrate in national or sovereign entities.
