= OBM =

OBM may refer to:

- Of Blessed Memory, an honorific used in Judaism when naming and speaking of the deceased.
- Old Brewery Mission, a homeless shelter located in Montreal.
- Organizational Behavior Management, applying the study of behavior to organizations to promote worker safety and other benefits
- Original brand manufacturer, a company that sells a product made in whole or in part by a second company as its own branded product
- Outboard motor, a propulsion system for boats
- OBM, in steelmaking "Oxygen Blowing Machine", (also Oxygen-Bottom-Maxhütte, Oxygen-Bodenblas-Metallurgie German), a process in Steelmaking
- Oliver Batista Meier, a German professional footballer
- Olimpíada Brasileira de Matemática, an annual mathematics competition for Brazilian students.
