= OTB =

OTB may refer to:

== Arts ==
- On the Boards, an arts organization in Seattle, Washington
- Out of the Blue (American band), a jazz ensemble

== Computing ==
- One True Brace, a software coding convention for formatting loops, functions, if statements, and blocks
- Orfeo toolbox, an open source library for remote sensing image processing
- OTA Bitmap, an image file specification for mobile phones (*.otb files)

== Sports and games ==
- Off-track betting, sanctioned gambling on horse racing outside a race track
- Over-the-board, in chess, played on a single physical chessboard (as opposed to correspondence or online chess)
- Off the ball, in association football, a player's movement when not in possession of the ball

== Companies ==
- OTB Group, a holding company for several fashion brands
- Office du Thé du Burundi, a public company that supports the tea industry in Burundi
- OTB Sports, a media company in Ireland

== Other ==
- Occupied Territories Bill, proposed Irish law to ban trade with Israeli settlements
- Off the boat, a pejorative slang phrase for newly arrived immigrants
- Overberg Test Range, or Overberg Toetsbaan, a missile test range in South Africa
- Overseas Trust Bank, a defunct bank of Hong Kong
- The Old Timer's Bulletin, an amateur radio history journal
