= OSI =

OSI may refer to:

== Places ==
- Osijek Airport (IATA code: OSI), an airport in Croatia
- Ősi, a village in Veszprém county, Hungary
- Oši, an archaeological site in Semigallia, Latvia
- Osi, a village in Ido-Osi, Ekiti State, Nigeria
- Osi, Ekiti LGA.Kwara State, Nigeria

== Organizations ==
- Oblates of St. Joseph, a Roman Catholic Religious order that uses the postnominal initials O.S.I.
- Open Source Initiative, an organization dedicated to promoting open source software
- Open Society Institute, a private charitable foundation established by George Soros to promote open societies around the world
- Open Society Institute-Baltimore, a locally based foundation that is part of Open Society Foundations
- Open Space Institute, an organization that seeks to preserve scenic, natural and historic landscapes
- Ordnance Survey International, a former subsidiary of the UK Ordnance Survey mapping agency
- Ordnance Survey Ireland (Suirbhéireacht Ordanáis Éireann)
- Otto-Suhr-Institut, the political-science institute of the Free University of Berlin

=== Companies ===
- OSI Group, an American holding company of meat processors that service the retail and food service industries
- OSI Pharmaceuticals, an American pharmaceutical company
- OSI Restaurant Partners, the restaurant and entertainment group that includes Outback Steakhouse
- OSI Systems, a company that manufactures security scanners and medical equipment based in California
- OSIsoft, a privately held company that develops device connectivity software
- Objective Systems Integrators, a company that provides monitoring software for communication networks
- Open Systems International, an automation software vendor for the electric, petroleum, transportation and water industries
- Officine Stampaggi Industriali, a defunct Italian coachbuilder
- Ohio Scientific Inc. (also known as Ohio Scientific Instruments), a US microcomputer manufacturer 1975–1981

=== Government ===
- Office of Scientific Intelligence, former name of a department of the Central Intelligence Agency now called the Directorate of Science and Technology
- Office of Strategic Influence, a former American government agency, part of the Department of Defense and focused on psychological warfare
- Office of Special Investigations (disambiguation), a name shared by several government agencies
  - U.S. Air Force Office of Special Investigations
  - Office of Special Investigations (Government Accountability Office)
  - Office of Special Investigations (United States Department of Justice)
- Office of Scientific Integrity, now United States Office of Research Integrity
- Office of Special Investigation, a secret intelligence unit of Republic of Korea Air Force
- Office of the Special Investigator Australia

== Technology ==
- Open Systems Interconnection, (ISO 7498) a joint ISO and ITU-T standard for computer networks and communication protocols
  - OSI model, a layered description for communications and computer network protocol design
  - OSI protocols
- Open switching interval, a type of disconnect supervision in telecommunication
- On-Site Inspection, an advanced measure technique combining several methods, especially used in order to detect nuclear tests
- Open_Semantic_Interchange Open Semantic Interchange

== Arts and entertainment ==
- OSI (band), an American progressive rock supergroup named after the former Office of Strategic Influence government agency
  - Office of Strategic Influence (album), the 2003 debut album by the band OSI
- Origin Systems, a former United States computer game developer
- Orchestra della Svizzera Italiana, an orchestra in southern Switzerland in the city of Lugano which is in the canton of Ticino

=== Fiction ===
- Office of Scientific Intelligence a fictional United States government agency in several television programs and movies;
- Office of Secret Intelligence, a fictional United States government secret agency in the animated series The Venture Bros.

== People ==
- Osi (ancient tribe), an ancient tribe in Europe
- Alans (ancient term Osi), an ancient tribe in the Caucasus
- Osi Umenyiora (born 1981), former American football player
- Osi Rhys Osmond (1942–2015), Welsh painter
- Jean-Paul Appel, also known as Osi, leader of the UFO religion Siderella

== Other uses ==
- Order of the Star of Italy, an order of chivalry
- Official sector involvement, in sovereign debt restructuring deals, as opposed to private sector involvement
- Options Symbology Initiative, a plan to change the way that exchange-traded options are named in option symbol
- Out-of-station interchange, a pedestrian change between two London Underground stations that allows continuity as part of one chargeable journey

== See also ==
- Osis (disambiguation)
