= Open Architecture System Integration Strategy =

The Open Architecture System Integration Strategy or OASIS Model was presented by Apple Computer as the philosophy behind the Mac in marketing beginning in 1989.

In the late 1980s, Apple Computer was worried about the legion of graphical user interfaces that would compete with the Mac OS. In addition to improved versions of Microsoft Windows, which had previously been unsuccessful, they were now facing IBMs Presentation Manager, HP's NewWave, Sun Microsystems' OPEN LOOK, and a host of other X11-based GUIs on various Unix platforms.

In response, Apple released a blizzard of marketing materials in 1989 trumpeting Apple's advantage, the OASIS Model. OASIS was the philosophy behind the Mac. In the documents they outlined the problems with grafting a GUI on top of an existing operating system, and showed how the Mac's "all in one" design allowed Apple to produce a much cleaner system.

OASIS was the little red book for the Mac-using community, an effort to rally the users around a single vision. In this respect it was a failure, as it seemed to many that it was an attempt to fend off competition. OASIS marketing disappeared with the release of System 7 in 1991.
