= OWN =

OWN may also refer to:

- Old West Norse, a North Germanic language
- Once Was Not (2005), an album by Cryptopsy
- One Warrior Nation, what The Ultimate Warrior calls his fans
- Oprah Winfrey Network, an American-based cable and satellite television channel
  - Oprah Winfrey Network (Canada), a Canadian cable and satellite television channel

== See also ==
- Ownership
- Owned, a slang word
