= Margaret Obi =

British judge

The Honourable Mrs Justice Obi
- Royal coat of arms of the United Kingdom

Justice of the High Court
- Incumbent
- Assumed office 3 October 2025
- Appointed by: Charles III

Dame Margaret Obi is a British judge who is a justice of the High Court. She is the most senior black judge in the United Kingdom.

== Biography ==
Margaret Obi was born and grew up in London. She is of Nigerian descent. She qualified as a solicitor in 1998. Obi worked as a special adviser to the International Criminal Court and the International Court of Justice in The Hague.

In 2018, she was appointed as a deputy High Court judge. In February 2023, she was appointed as the first Service Police Complaints Commissioner. In December 2024, she ruled that twelve asylum seekers had been unlawfully detained as an Acting Judge of the Supreme Court of the British Indian Ocean Territory. In 2025, she was appointed as a House of Lords Commissioner for Standards.

In 2025, she was appointed to the High Court of Justice and assigned to the King's Bench Division. She became the first black woman solicitor to be appointed to the court.

== See also ==
- List of High Court judges of England and Wales
