= One Buck Short =

- Origin: Kuala Lumpur, Malaysia
- Genres: Punk rock, pop punk
- Years active: 2001–present
- Labels: Skesh; Magic Milk; Universal
- Members: Mundzir Abdul Latif (Mooky) (vocals); Rahul Kukreja (guitar/vocals); Imran Fadzil (drums); Izal (bass)
- Past members: Alang Sekitar; Hafiz Ellahi; Zack Kim
- Website: youtube.com/onebuckshort

One Buck Short (OBS) are a Malaysian punk rock / pop punk band from Kuala Lumpur. Known for their energetic live performances, the band built a legion of fans across Asia following their first release, the 2003 EP titled "Where's The Mouse?!". Following a series of support tours for everyone from My Chemical Romance to Fall Out Boy, the band, which celebrates their 20th anniversary in 2023, is still one of the biggest rock acts in the region (South East Asia).

== Summary ==
In 2008, One Buck Short released their debut album Halal & Loving It. It produced the hit singles "Fast Times", "Kelibat Korupsi" and "Khayalan Masa". With producer/arranger Greg Henderson at the helm, it was hailed by many as one of the best locally produced Malaysian rock albums ever.

The band went on to open for acts including Fall Out Boy (in Singapore), Panic! At the Disco, My Chemical Romance and Good Charlotte. The band was the only Malaysian act billed for the inaugural SingFest in 2007 and also performed at the very first MTV Asia Awards held in Malaysia. The band went on to perform in Australia, the Philippines, China and Macau.

In January 2012, the band released their second album entitled Kampong Glam. Their sophomore release was their first full Malay album, with 7 tracks including the single "Carilah Duit".

After a long hiatus, the band announced their return to the scene earlier this year as well as the comeback of Rockaway Festival, the local rock festival the band founded and has been hosting since 2009.

== Releases and Rockaway ==
The band was founded by Hafiz and Rahul in high school. Hafiz and Rahul started out by jamming after school to bands like The Ataris and Blink 182 while gaining exposure playing events at their schools and colleges. It was in college where Rahul met Mooky and where Hafiz met Imran. As both their colleges were close by (Rahul and Mooky went to APIIT while Imran and Hafiz went to HELP University), they ended up rehearsing together often. Soon they started getting themselves onto "battle of the bands" competitions before starting to tour in the local scene and all over Malaysia.

In 2003, One Buck Short released their debut EP, Where's The Mouse?! via FYI Entertainment, a local underground and independent label. The EP was recorded, mixed and mastered at the now defunct Syncrosound Studios in Petaling Jaya. Their debut single, "That Day" from their EP Where's The Mouse?!, broke into the Malaysian Top 10 charts on the Hitz.fm radio station and eventually became one of the most popular local releases on Malaysian radio that year. The band was also nominated for the Best Newcomer artist award at the first ever Hitz.FM Malaysian English Top 10 awards in 2004. One Buck Short rounded up 2004 by being one of the standout acts and performers for one of the longest running rock festivals in Malaysia, "Rock The World IV"; the band has since been a recurring headliner for the "Rock The World" series.

It was at Syncrosound Studios where the band ended up meeting and eventually working with their longtime friend and collaborator Greg Henderson (ARIA & AIM award-winning producer & sound engineer). The first project Greg and One Buck Short worked on together was a single for a charity Christmas album compilation (A MusicCanteen Christmas) called Christmas Morning which also ended up getting heavy air play Malaysian radio. The band having enjoyed working with Greg decided to start work on their debut album Halal & Loving It with him not long after. Credit was never given to Rahul's cousin Avtar Singh (aman) who came up with the title for the album 'Halal & Loving It.' Throughout this period, One Buck Short continued to play shows across Asia while the band wrote and recorded the album. The band's live and energetic shows started attracting attention from promoters across Asia and Australia which put them in a position to be handpicked by a long list of international touring bands, including Fall Out Boy in Singapore and Good Charlotte, Panic! at the Disco, My Chemical Romance and Sum 41 in Kuala Lumpur. On top of supporting many artists on their tours in Asia, OBS was also featured in prominent music festivals in the region. In 2006, the band was nominated for Best Rock and Best Live Act for the Malaysian English Top 10 Awards held on December 10, 2006.

After various label and management changes, Halal & Loving It was released in 2008 via Homegrown Records and Universal Music Malaysia. The release got a regional push and marketing campaign and propelled the band into one of South East Asia's largest rock acts.

One Buck Short had a number of hit singles from Halal & Loving It including "Fast Times", "Kelibat Korupsi" – a song in the band's native language about the rampant corruption the country faced, "10:04" – a track influenced by the band's favorite movie Back to the Future, and "Khayalan Masa".

Not long after, OBS signed on an endorsement deal with Jack & Jill Potato chips which ended in them conceptualizing and producing the band's very own music festival, Rockaway. One Buck Short became the first band in Asia to successfully own, operate and produce their own music festival. The first edition of the festival saw over 15,000 people pack the heart of city in Kuala Lumpur and featured many of the band's friends. In conjunction with Rockaway 2009, the band released a single titled "Wait For It (Revolution)" produced by Luke Mason. Rahul continued to produce Rockaway along with The Livescape Group, turning it into Malaysia's largest rock festival.

== OBS have been billed alongside ==
- My Chemical Romance
- Paramore
- Twenty One Pilots
- Fall Out Boy
- Good Charlotte
- Panic At The Disco
- Sum 41
- MXPX
- Mayday Parade
- The Used
- Dashboard Confessional
- Cobra Starship
- All Time Low
- Taking Back Sunday
- The Get Up Kids
- Third Eye Blind
- The Academy Is
- Gym Class Heros

and many many more!

== Sources ==
- Malaysian Bands Soar at Rockaway
- Making the most out of Malaysia
- Recent One Buck Short interview on Malaysian radio BFM
- WTF RU - One Buck Short interview on Juicy
- The Level features One Buck Short and Rockaway 2016
- I predict a riot! - OBS Redbull interview
- 6 PERKARA YANG ANDA MUNGKIN TIDAK KETAHUI MENGENAI OBS
