= OJ =

OJ may refer to:

- Orange juice

== People ==
=== In American football ===
- O. J. Simpson (1947–2024), American football player, broadcaster, actor, and convicted felon
- Ottis Jerome "O.J." Anderson (born 1957), American football player
- O. J. Brigance (1969–2026), American football player
- O. J. Childress (born 1976), American football player
- OJ Frederique Jr., American football player
- O. J. Howard (born 1994), American football player
- O. J. McDuffie (born 1969), American football player

=== In other sports ===
- O. J. Mayo (born 1987), American professional basketball player
- Olivier Jacque (born 1973), French motorcycle road racer
- Olli Jokinen (born 1978), Finnish ice hockey player
- Orlando Jordan (born 1974), American professional wrestler
- Omar 'OJ' Koroma (born 1989), Gambian footballer
- OJ Porteria (born 1994), Filipino footballer
- O. J. Hogans (born 1982), American sprinter

=== In music ===
- OJ da Juiceman (born 1981), American rapper
- Oran "Juice" Jones (born 1959), American soul and R&B singer and actor
- Orlando Julius (born 1943), Nigerian musician sometimes referred to as OJ

=== In other fields ===
- Dennis Mugo, Kenyan actor known as OJ
- OJ Borg (born 1979), British television and radio presenter
- Olivia Jade (born 1999), social media influencer and USC student
- Lindsay Owen-Jones (born 1946), British chairman and CEO of the cosmetics and beauty company L'Oréal

=== Groups of people ===
- Old Johnians:
  - Category:People educated at St John's School, Leatherhead, alumni of St. John's School, Leatherhead, England
  - Category:People educated at Hurstpierpoint College, alumni of Hurstpierpoint College, England
- The O'Jays, a 1970s soul group from Philadelphia, Pennsylvania, United States
- The Order of Jamaica, the fifth of the six orders in the Jamaican honours system, roughly equivalent to a knighthood in the British honours system, with the post-nominal letters 'OJ' and 'OJ (Hon.)'

== Fictional characters ==
- OJ Haywood, a character from the 2022 film Nope
- O.J. (TUGS), a character from the 1988 children's television series TUGS

== Languages ==
- Ojibwe language (ISO 639-2 code: oj)
- Old Japanese
- Plural suffix in Esperanto

== Travel ==
- Overland Airways (IATA airline designator: OJ)
- Open-jaw ticket, a type of airline ticket

== Other uses ==
- OJ (programming tool), a programming tool that analyzes Java code
- Official Journal of the European Union
- CJOJ-FM, a Canadian radio station formerly called OJ 95.5
- Orange Julius, a chain of fruit drink beverage stores, or the fruit drink itself
- Japanese model railway gauge for cape gauge in 0 scale

== See also ==
- Juice (disambiguation)
