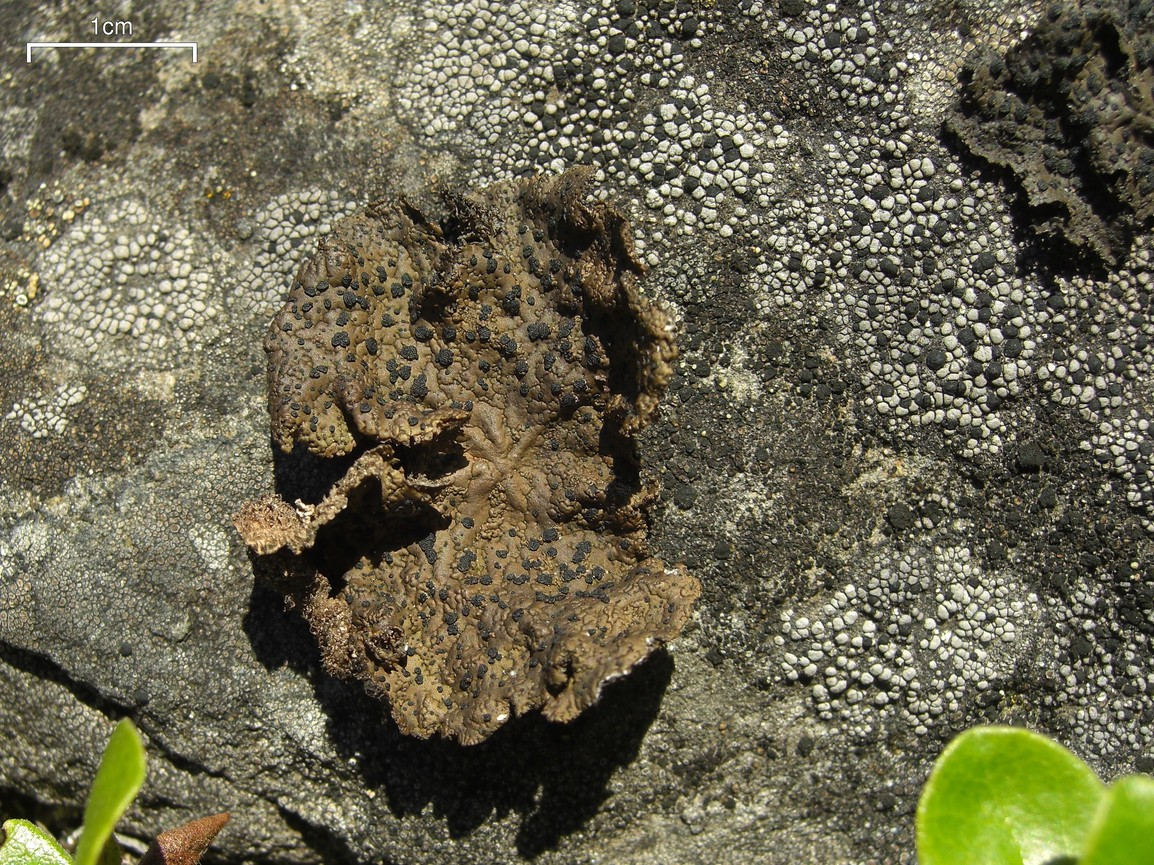

Conservation status
- Secure (NatureServe)

Scientific classification
- Kingdom: Fungi
- Division: Ascomycota
- Class: Lecanoromycetes
- Order: Umbilicariales
- Family: Umbilicariaceae
- Genus: Umbilicaria
- Species: U. torrefacta

Binomial name
- Umbilicaria torrefacta (Lightf.) Schrad. (1794)

Synonyms
- List: Lichen torrefactus Lightf. (1777); Gyrophora erosa var. torrefacta (Lightf.) Th.Fr. (1871); Gyrophora erosa f. torrefacta (Lightf.) Cromb. (1880); Gyrophora torrefacta (Lightf.) Cromb. (1894); Umbilicaria erosa var. torrefacta (Lightf.) Frey (1933); Lichen verrucosus With. (1776); Lichen erosus Weber (1778); Umbilicaria erosa (Weber) Ach. (1794); Gyrophora erosa (Weber) Ach. (1803); Gyromium erosum (Weber) Wahlenb. (1812); Lecidea erosa (Weber) Spreng. (1827); Umbilicaria varia var. erosa (Weber) Leight. (1856); Gyrophora torrefacta var. erosa (Weber) Lynge (1937); Umbilicaria torrefacta var. erosa (Weber) Oxner (1968); Gyrophora erosa var. torrida Ach. (1803); Lichen erosus * torrida (Ach.) Lam. (1813); Gyrophora torrida (Ach.) Röhl. (1813); Umbilicaria erosa var. torrida (Ach.) Nyl. (1861); Umbilicaria torrida (Ach.) Nyl. (1876); Umbilicaria erosa f. torrida (Ach.) Vain. (1898)

= Umbilicaria torrefacta =

Species of lichen

Umbilicaria torrefacta is a species of saxicolous (rock-dwelling), foliose lichen in the family Umbilicariaceae. It is an arctic-alpine species with a circumpolar distribution and is widely distributed within the Holarctic realm, specifically within the Palearctic and Neoarctic biogeographical regions. Characteristic features of Umbilicaria torrefacta include the lace-like fringe in its lobes and the plates on the underside of the thallus. One common name, punctured rock-tripe, refers to the distinctive sieve-like perforations on the thallus margins.

The species was scientifically described in 1777 by John Lightfoot and later classified under the genus Umbilicaria by Heinrich Schrader in 1794. Because of its somewhat variable morphology, this species has often been misidentified historically and described under different names, resulting in an extensive synonymy. In 2017, a lectotype specimen was designated for the species, clarifying its taxonomic status. Molecular phylogenetics studies have revealed complex relationships within the family Umbilicariaceae, resulting in the revision of the genus Umbilicaria. U. torrefacta is a member of Gyrophora, a subgenus characterised by species with circular ridges on the discs of their apothecia; rigid, non-pustulate thalli; and specific secondary metabolites, such as gyrophoric acid and stictic acid.

Umbilicaria torrefacta has distinct spectral properties, transmitting very little light and significantly altering the spectral signature of rock surfaces. It shows slow initial growth and delayed reproduction, with reproductive output increasing linearly with thallus size. The population structure is skewed towards smaller individuals, indicating ongoing recruitment and colonisation in newly exposed areas. These characteristics enable U. torrefacta to adapt and maintain a stable presence in challenging alpine environments.

Umbilicaria torrefacta can be compared to U. dura, U. multistrata, and U. semitensis, all of which share similarities in appearance but can be distinguished by differences in spore type, thallus structure, colouration, and chemical components, with specific distinctions in geographical distribution and spore size. In the Scottish Highlands it has been used as a dye lichen, with fermentation in ammonia yielding purplish-red to purple colours used for tartans and other textiles.

== Taxonomy ==
Umbilicaria torrefacta was first described and named in 1777 by the English parson-naturalist John Lightfoot, as Lichen torrefactus. The type specimen was collected by Lightfoot in the Scottish Highlands. He called it a "sad-colour'd crumpled Lichen, with black curled warts" and noted that it was "frequent upon the highland rocks". The species epithet torrefacta comes from the Latin word meaning "roasted", which aptly describes the lichen's dark brown, glazed upper surface. In 1794, Heinrich Schrader reclassified the species under the genus Umbilicaria, resulting in the current binomial name, Umbilicaria torrefacta. The genus name Umbilicaria was introduced by Georg Franz Hoffmann, and it includes mostly rock-dwelling species primarily found in boreal, alpine, and Arctic regions worldwide.

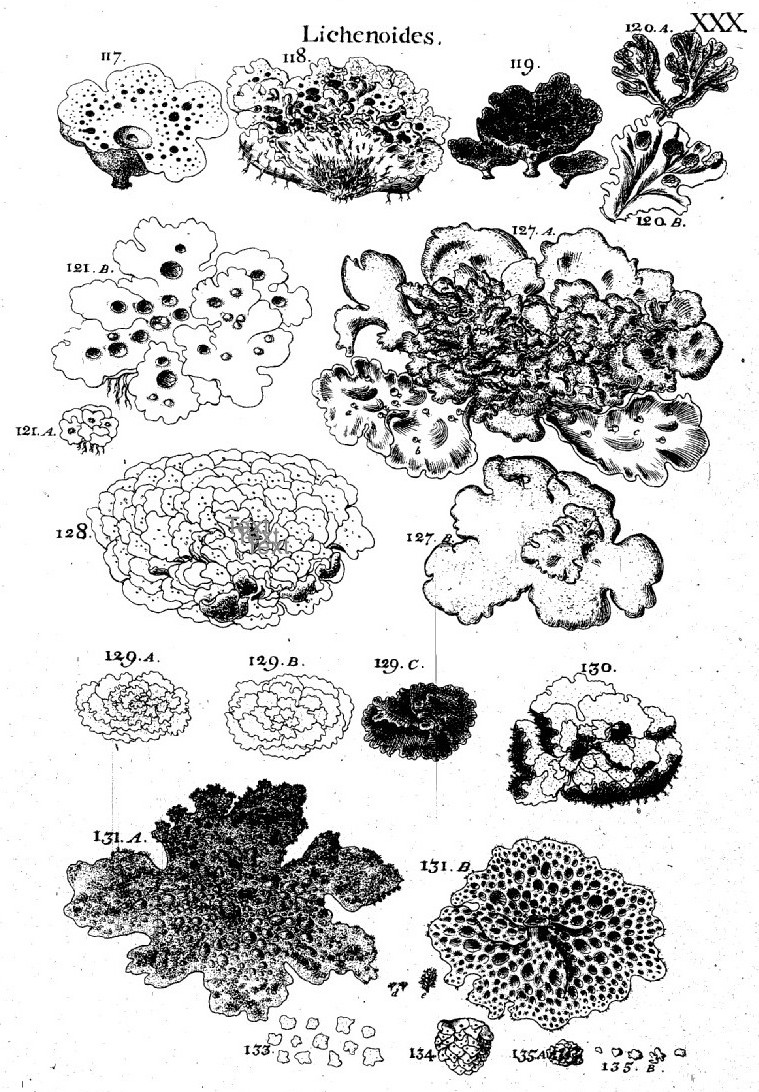
One of Dillenius' herbarium specimens, illustrated here as image #118 on plate 30 of Historia muscorum, was chosen to be the lectotype of Umbilicaria torrefacta.

Lightfoot's description highlighted several key features of the lichen. He observed that it consists of one or several leaves of a somber black, brown, or dull hue, connected at the base by a central point or umbilicus. He noted the upper side to be wrinkled with lobed and uneven margins, and a higher concentration of thin, compressed fibres and granulation towards the centre. The space between the fibres is finely granulated, and he compared the resulting slight roughness similar to the texture of shagreen, a type of textured leather. He also described the fruiting bodies as numerous, wrinkled, black sessile tubercles that seem to be composed of curled hairs, resembling those of Umbilicaria cylindrica, though less regular and less shiny. Lightfoot remarked that this lichen was represented in one of the well-known images of cryptogams depicted by Johann Jacob Dillenius in his 1741 work Historia muscorum.

Umbilicaria torrefacta is known for its distinctive sieve-like perforations on the thallus margins, leading to vernacular names such as "punctured rock-tripe", or "perforated rock-tripe". The perforations may be more readily seen if held up against a light. This characteristic feature makes it relatively easy to distinguish from other species within the genus. "Torn brain-moss" is a historical vernacular name for the species that was suggested by Samuel Frederick Gray in 1821.

Despite detailed early descriptions, proper typification of U. torrefacta faced challenges due to a history of synonyms and misidentifications. In 2017, Geir Hestmark designated a lectotype from the herbarium of Dillenius, which corresponds well with Lightfoot's original description. The lectotypification stabilised usage of the name in subsequent treatments.

Molecular phylogenetics studies have shown that the traditional circumscription of the genus Umbilicaria was paraphyletic, meaning that it did not include all descendants from a common ancestor. Modern treatments recognise subgenus Gyrophora, including U. torrefacta, which is characterised by its rigid, non-pustulate thalli and specific chemical compounds, including gyrophoric and lecanoric acids. The species in subgenus Gyrophora typically have smooth or granular upper surfaces and lack the pustulate structures seen in some other members of the family. This group is primarily found in the Holarctic region, covering both northern North America and Eurasia.

=== Synonymy ===
Due to its somewhat variable morphology, this species has been referred to in the earlier literature under various names. In 1778, Georg Heinrich Weber called it Lichen erosus, and several synonyms were created when this epithet was recombined into different genera. At some point, some authors referred to torrefacta as a variety or form of erosus, even though it was published a year earlier and thus had priority. In 1803 Erik Acharius introduced the epithet torrida (as Gyrophora erosa var. torrida), which was reused in later combinations.

== Description ==
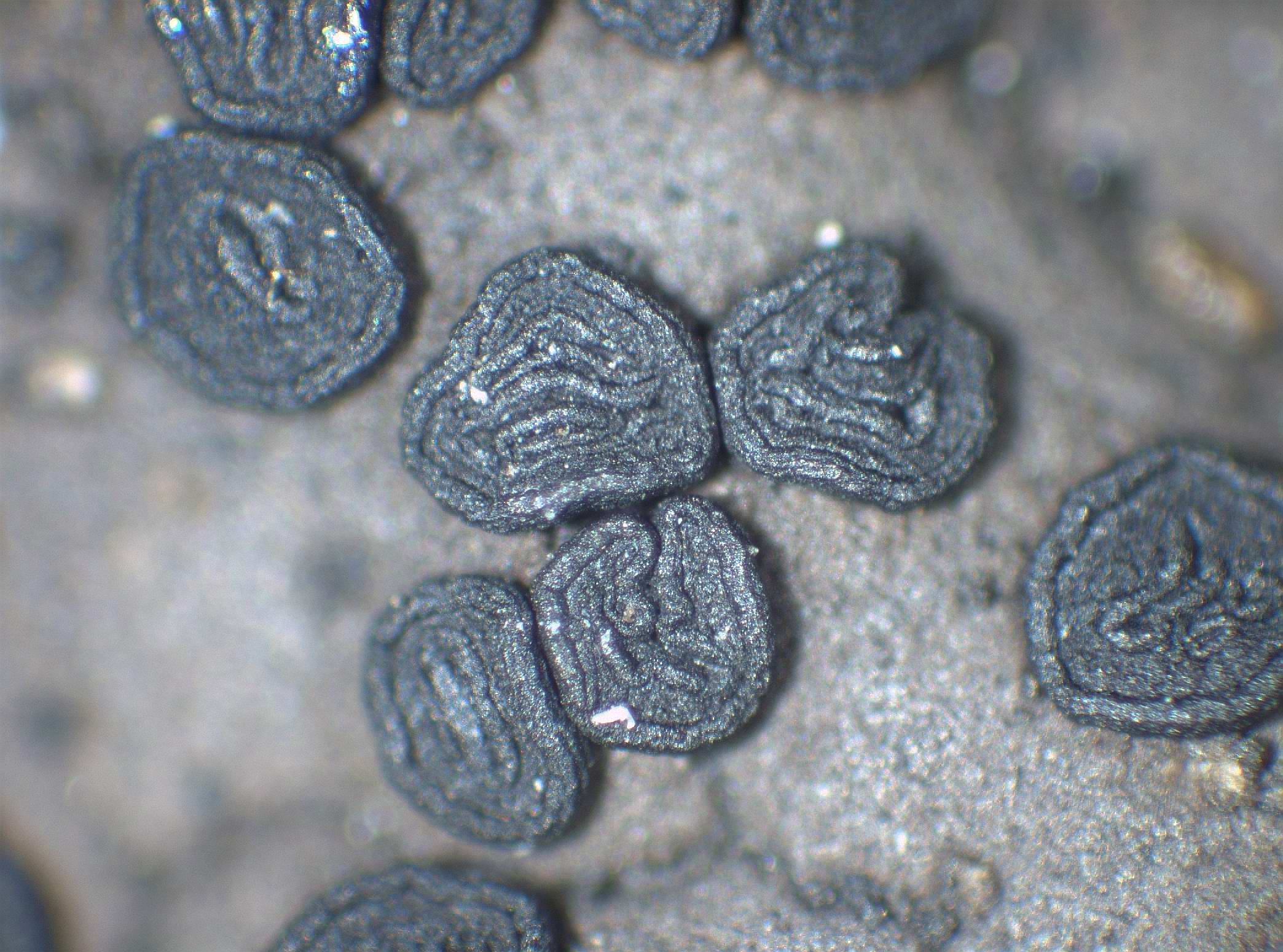
Closeup of gyrose apothecia of Umbilicaria torrefacta

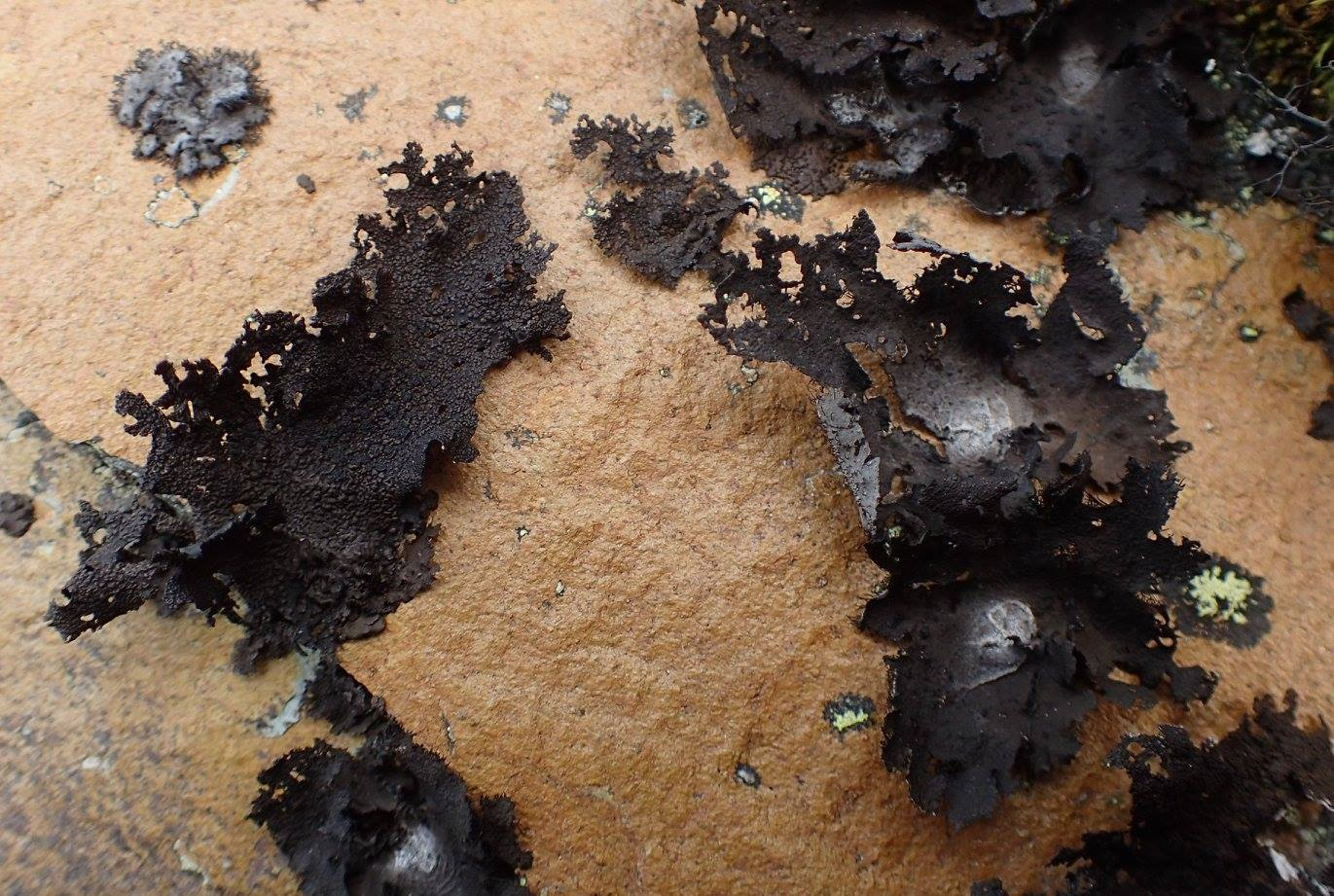
Thallus underside

Umbilicaria torrefacta is a lichen with a thallus that ranges from 2 to 6 cm (3/4 to 2 3/8 in) in diameter and consists of a single lobe. The thalli are typically monophyllous—connected to the substrate at a single point of attachment called an umbilicus. The thallus is often crumpled, with the edges finely dissected and perforated by small holes, giving it a lace-like appearance. These perforations may occasionally appear towards the centre. The upper surface colour ranges from brown to dark brown, and can be either smooth or have a cracked, wart-like texture. McCune and Geiser liken the surface cracks to "sutures in a skull" and treat them as characteristic. The lower surface varies from pale brown to black and features irregular, thin, somewhat flattened layers resembling plates (trabeculae) that are often torn or perforated. Although rhizines (root-like structures) are absent in this species, torn fringes of trabeculae may be mistaken for rhizines. Nineteenth-century authors noted a tea-like odour on rewetting.

Apothecia (fruiting bodies) are common and measure 0.5 to 2 mm in diameter. They are slightly immersed in depressions on the thallus and have a twisted, gyrose appearance with black discs. The paraphyses (sterile filaments among the spores) are unbranched with brown tips. The ascospores (spores produced in the fruiting bodies) are colourless, hyaline (translucent), ellipsoid in shape, and not divided by septa (internal partitions). Different spore measurements have been reported in the literature: 7 to 16.5 μm long by 5 to 10 μm wide from a European source, and 8 to 12 μm long by 4 to 6 μm wide from a North American source. Thalloconidia (asexual reproductive spores) are absent.

In anatomical studies, the thallus of U. torrefacta shows considerable variability in the thickness of its layers. For instance, the algal layer thickness ranges from 25 to 65 μm, and the medulla varies between 40 and 105 μm. The upper cortex is typically 10 to 25 μm thick, while the lower cortex ranges from 15 to 27.5 μm. These adaptations help the lichen optimise photosynthesis and maintain hydration under different environmental conditions.

The medulla of Umbilicaria torrefacta is classified as the "Ruebeliuna" type. This type is characterised by scleroplectenchyma, which means it consists of tightly packed hyphae without a preferential orientation. Both transverse and radial sections of this medulla have a similar appearance, resembling an arachnoidal (spider web-like) network of hyphae. The cells within these medullae are even more densely packed than in the "Deusta" type, resulting in narrow protoplasts that are challenging to observe under normal light microscope magnifications.

Chemical tests reveal that the medulla (the inner layer of the thallus) reacts with certain chemical spot tests: it turns C+ (red) and KC+ (red), indicating the presence of gyrophoric acid and lecanoric acid. It remains unreactive with K and Pd. However, when stictic acid is present, the medulla reacts K+ (yellow) and Pd+ (orange).

== Similar species ==
The underside of Umbilicaria angulata also features plates positioned close to the umbilicus, but this species typically has branched, cylindrical rhizines. Another lookalike, Umbilicaria hyperborea, has a thallus surface similar to U. torrefacta and can even develop slight perforations; however, its lower surface is predominantly smooth.

Umbilicaria torrefacta can be compared to Umbilicaria semitensis, which has several distinct features despite their superficial similarities. Both species inhabit rocky environments, but U. semitensis is found from southern California to southern Oregon, often at higher elevations, such as in Yosemite National Park. One characteristic difference between the two species is the spore type: U. semitensis has larger muriform spores, whereas U. torrefacta possesses smaller, simpler spores. Additionally, the lower surface of U. semitensis can vary from dark brown to black with distinct rhizines, sometimes giving it a similar appearance to U. torrefacta. However, U. torrefacta is usually characterised by a paler brown lower surface with plates (trabeculae) and rhizines, distinguishing it from the typically darker U. semitensis. These differences are used to separate the species in treatments.

Lookalikes
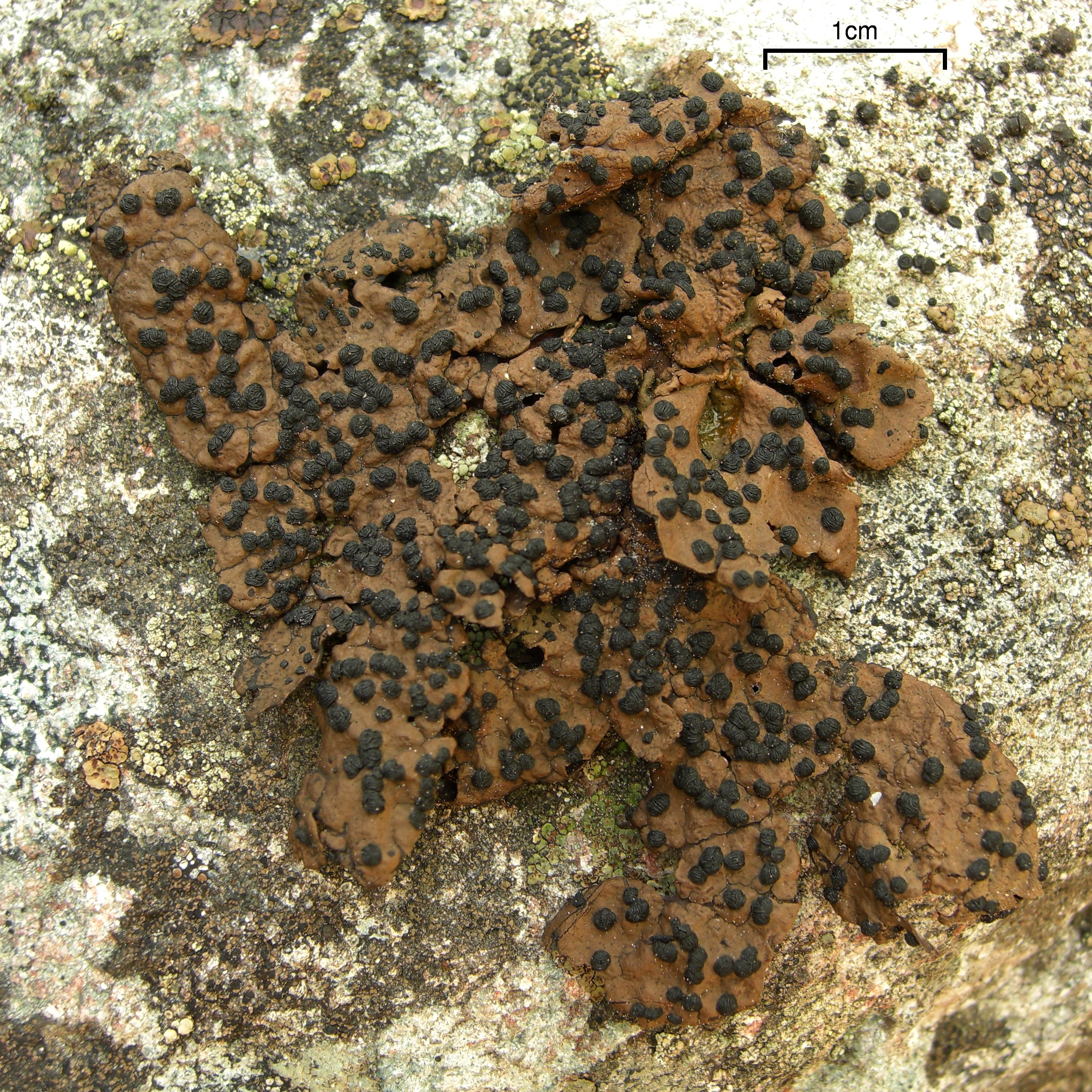
Umbilicaria hyperborea

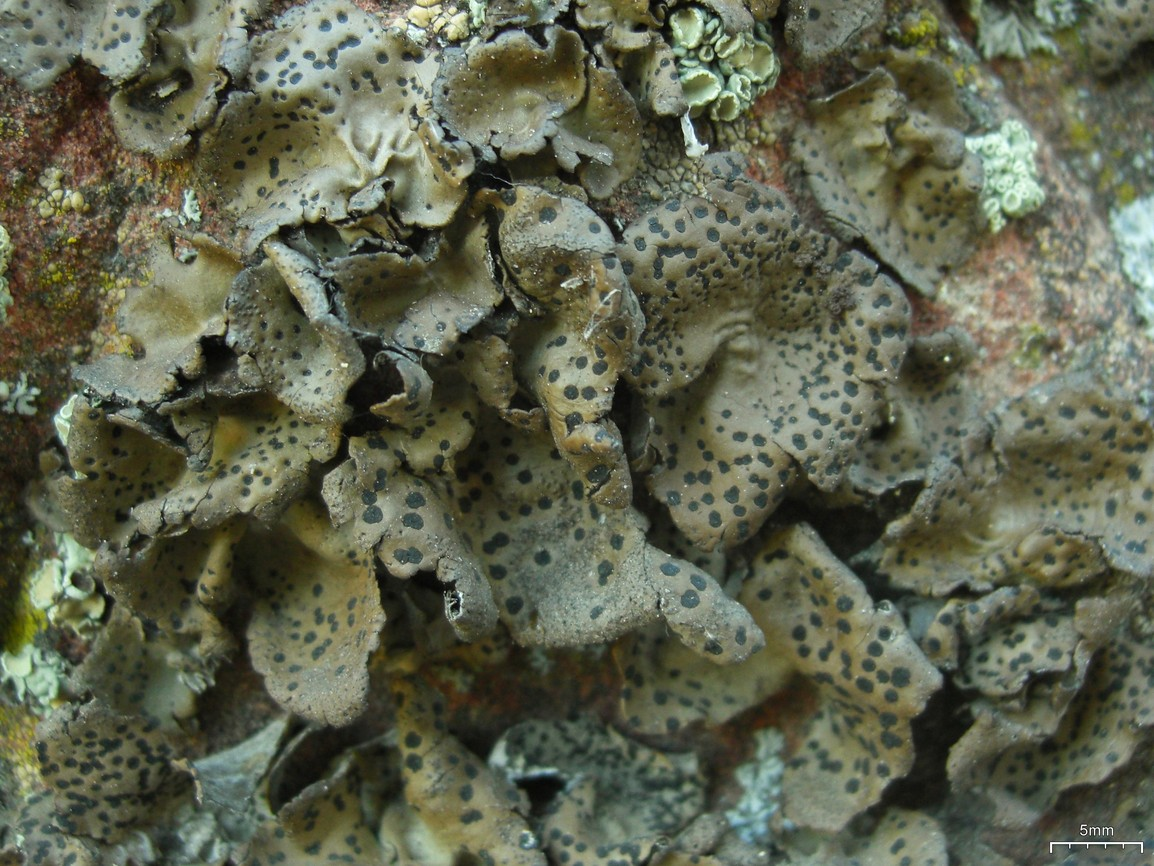
Umbilicaria angulata

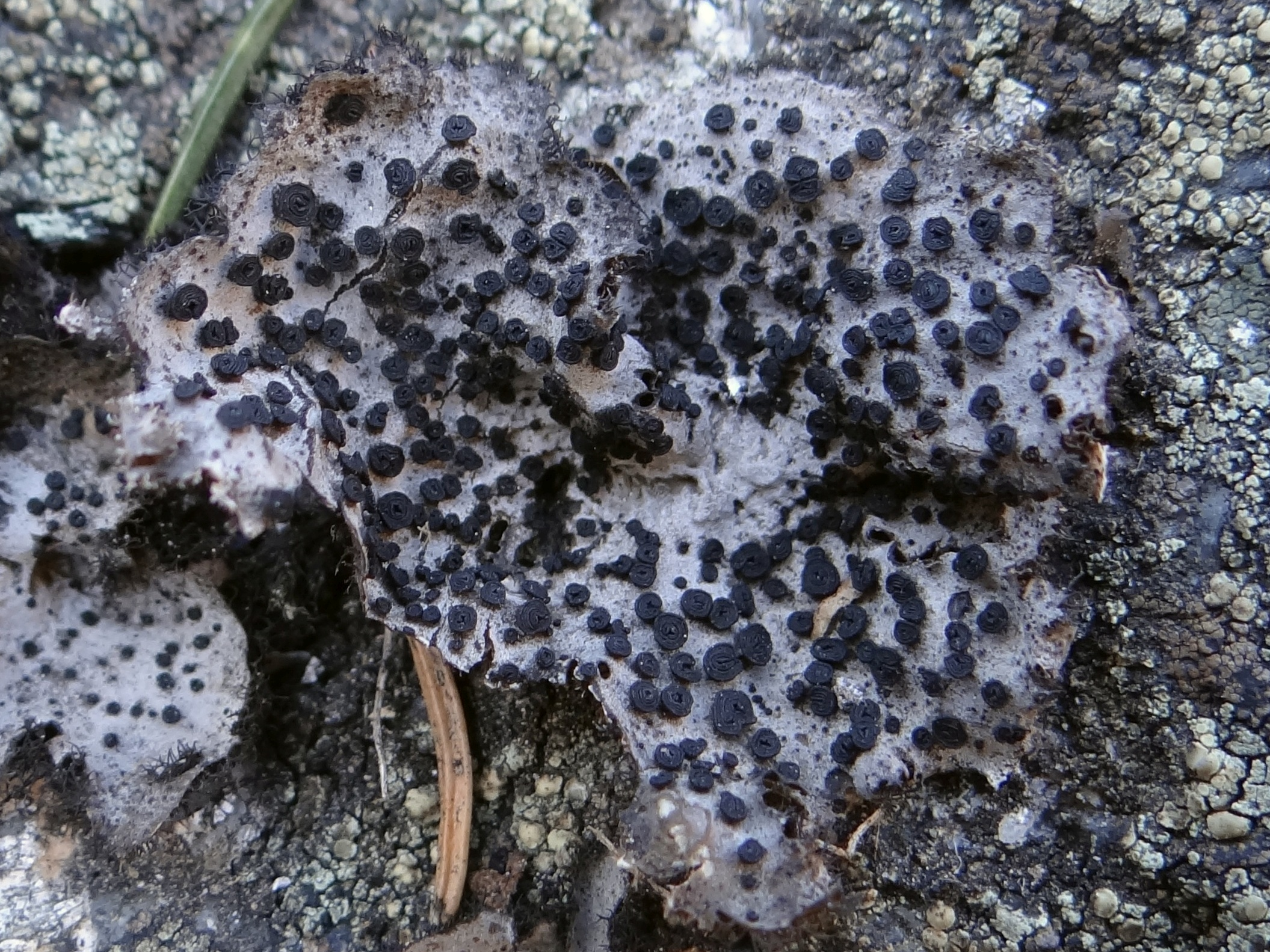
Umbilicaria cylindrica

Umbilicaria dura, described as a new species in 2018, is similar in appearance to Umbilicaria torrefacta but can be distinguished by its tougher, thicker thallus and darker colouration. The lower surface of U. dura is dark brown to black, featuring one to several layers of trabeculae and rhizines, which contribute to its multilayered appearance. In contrast, U. torrefacta typically has a lighter lower surface with a single layer of trabeculae. Chemically, U. dura contains gyrophoric acid as a major component and lacks umbilicaric acid. The spores of U. dura are also generally smaller, measuring 7.5–9.5 μm in length compared to those of U. torrefacta. U. dura is primarily found in Alaska and the Cascade Range of Oregon and Washington, preferring semi-sheltered rock faces.

Umbilicaria multistrata, another species described in 2018, closely resembles U. torrefacta. It is characterised by a thick thallus and a black lower surface with multiple layers of trabeculae and rhizines, similar to U. dura. However, U. multistrata can be distinguished by the presence of umbilicaric acid in addition to gyrophoric acid, which is not found in U. torrefacta. The spores of U. multistrata are slightly larger, typically measuring 8.8–11.0 μm in length. U. multistrata is known only from Alaska, where it grows on steeply sloping, somewhat sheltered surfaces of noncalcareous rock. While U. torrefacta can occasionally have a black lower surface and a moderately thick thallus, it usually does not develop the extensive multilayered trabeculae seen in U. multistrata.

Umbilicaria torrefacta can be distinguished from Umbilicaria nodulospora by the latter's greyish-brown thallus, which often develops deep cracks and has angular to stellate juvenile apothecia. U. nodulospora also features a rhizinate lower surface and produces asymmetric, nodulose ascospores, in contrast to the symmetrical, ellipsoid ascospores of U. torrefacta. Additionally, U. nodulospora is primarily found on basalt in central Oregon to northeastern California, preferring steep, north-facing slopes.

== Habitat and distribution ==
Umbilicaria torrefacta is occurs in rocky, alpine environments within the Holarctic region, covering both the Palearctic and Nearctic biogeographical areas. It grows on rock outcrops, both open and sheltered. According to Llano's 1950 monograph on Umbilicaria, in North America, it has not been recorded south of the White Mountains of California and has not been found in South America. It grows in the splash zone of coastal ecosystems, particularly along the White Sea in Russia. This lichen species prefers a range of coastal habitats, growing on vertical rock faces and in boulder fields. It is occasionally exposed to sea spray, although it tends to favour more sheltered, less frequently wetted environments compared to its relative Umbilicaria deusta. In the Nuuk region of southern Greenland, U. torrefacta is typically found on somewhat moist siliceous rocks, and often in the company of a community of lichens that includes Aspicilia berntii, Bellemerea subsorediza, Lecidea lapicida, Miriquidica atrofulva, Miriquidica leucophaea, Miriquidica nigroleprosa, Montanelia disjuncta, Orphniospora moriopsis, and Pseudephebe minuscula.

== Ecology ==
=== Spectral properties ===
Umbilicaria torrefacta has distinct spectral properties that have been studied to understand its interaction with light and the implications for remote sensing. Reflectance spectra for U. torrefacta range from 3% to 7% in the visible spectrum, which is relatively low due to the presence of chlorophyll and other pigments that absorb light. This lichen species, like many others, shows specific absorption features near 685 nanometres (nm) associated with chlorophyll, making it identifiable through hyperspectral imaging. The reflectance gradually increases in the near-infrared region, peaking around 1860 nm.

Studies on light transmittance through U. torrefacta demonstrate that it transmits very little light, typically less than 3% across the 350–2500 nm spectral range. This low transmittance means that U. torrefacta effectively masks the underlying rock substrate, preventing light from penetrating through the lichen to the rock beneath. This characteristic is crucial for remote sensing applications, as it indicates that the presence of U. torrefacta can significantly alter the spectral signature of rock surfaces, necessitating the use of spectral unmixing techniques to differentiate between lichen-covered and bare rock areas.

=== Growth and reproduction ===
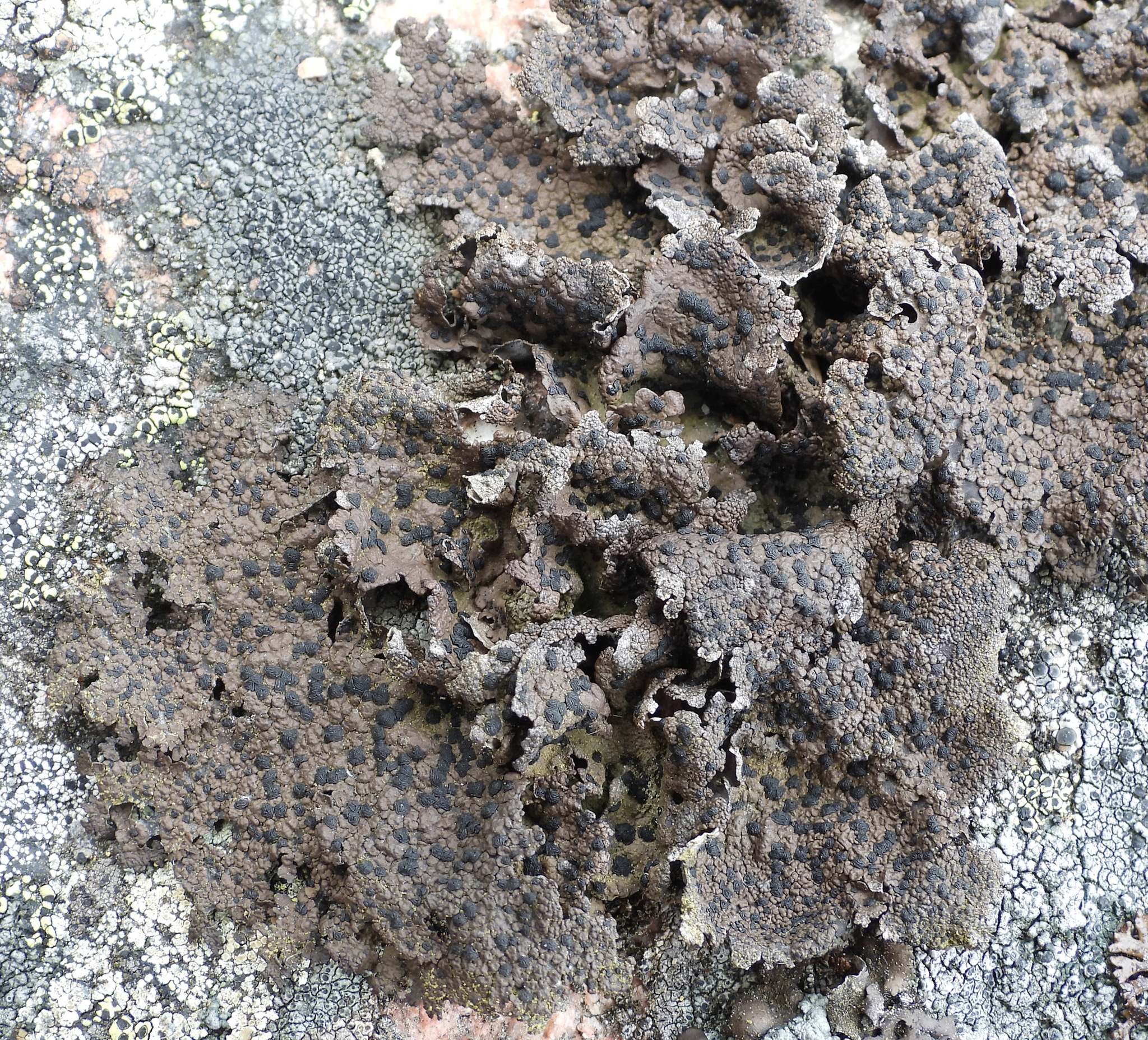
Umbilicaria torrefacta in Finland

Umbilicaria torrefacta has a pattern of growth characterised by rapid initial expansion followed by a gradual slowdown as it approaches its maximum size. A study conducted over a 240-year chronosequence in the foreland of the Hellstugubreen glacier in Jotunheimen National Park, Norway, found that the initial growth rate of U. torrefacta is relatively slow compared to other Umbilicaria species, averaging 0.9 mm per year. The maximum observed thallus diameter was 47 mm, with the growth period extending to approximately 107 years. This growth pattern reflects a common trend among alpine lichens, where rapid early growth is followed by a stabilisation phase as the lichen matures.

Reproduction in U. torrefacta is closely related to thallus size. Apothecium production increases with the size of the thallus, with the first fertile individuals appearing at around 8 to 12 mm in diameter. However, U. torrefacta tends to start reproducing later than some of its relatives, such as U. hyperborea, which begins to reproduce at smaller sizes. The reproductive output continues to grow with thallus size, but the trend is more linear compared to the exponential reproductive increase seen in U. hyperborea. This suggests a more steady reproductive strategy, likely influenced by the harsh alpine conditions in which U. torrefacta grows.

=== Population structure ===
The population structure of U. torrefacta in the studied glacier foreland is highly skewed towards smaller individuals. This skewed size distribution indicates ongoing recruitment and colonisation in newly exposed areas, typical of primary succession in alpine environments. Most individuals are found in the smaller size classes, reflecting a population predominantly composed of younger thalli. Despite this, the species demonstrates resilience and the ability to establish itself successfully in newly available habitats, contributing to the stability and persistence of alpine lichen communities over time. Size-class distributions were skewed to small thalli, consistent with ongoing recruitment during primary succession.

=== Structural adaptations ===
Along the White Sea coast, material of U. torrefacta shows marked, site-dependent variation in thallus architecture—upper and lower cortex, algal layer and medulla—across exposed versus sheltered rock surfaces and microhabitats differing in humidity and irradiance; measurements indicate these layers can be appreciably thicker or thinner according to local conditions. Across this environmental range, pigment profiles (chlorophylls and carotenoids) remain comparatively stable. These studies document pronounced morphological plasticity with relatively conservative pigment composition under coastal White Sea microclimates.

== Uses ==
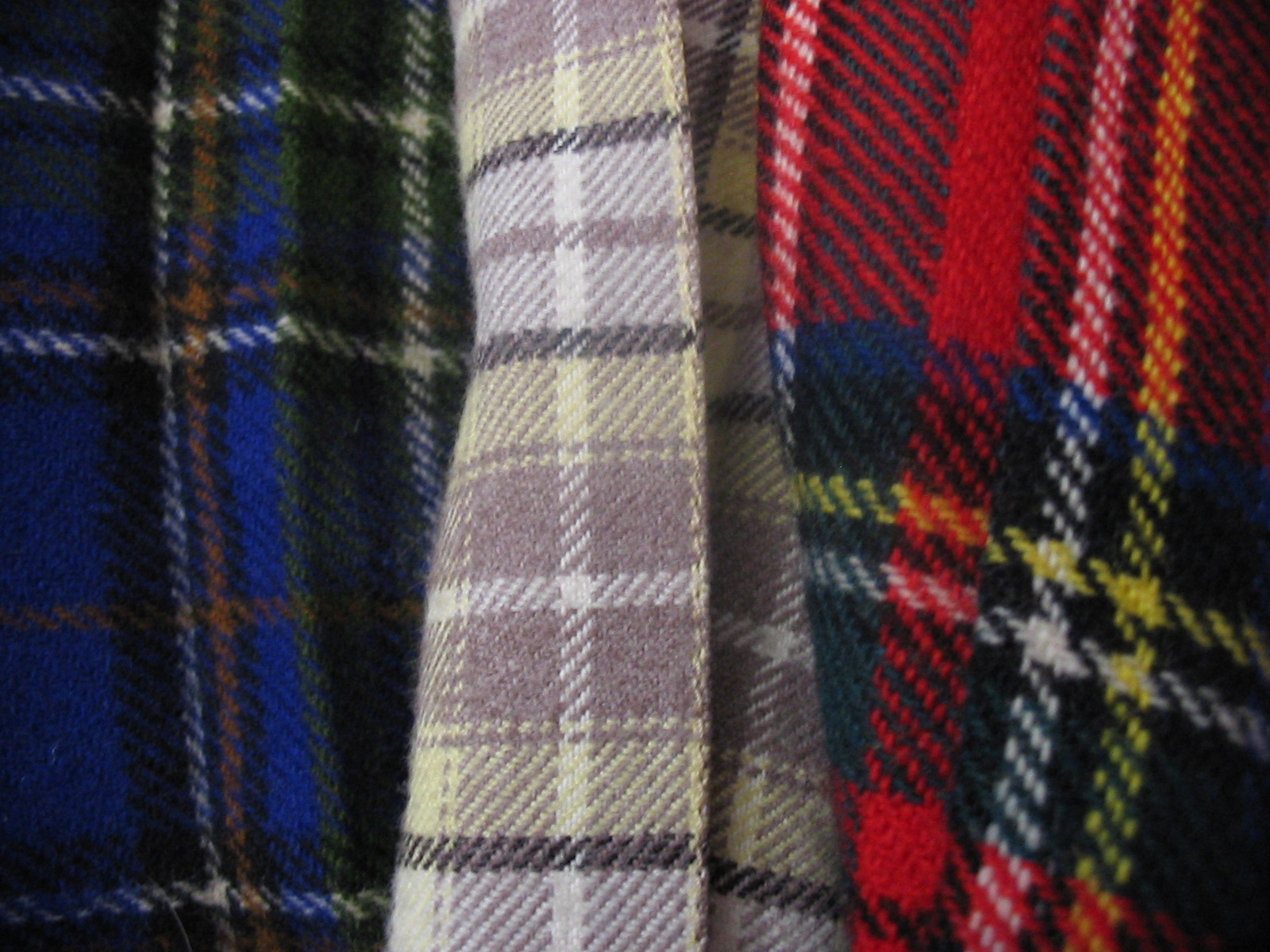
Tartan fabrics

Umbilicaria torrefacta holds historical significance as a natural dye in the Scottish Highlands. This lichen, commonly referred to as one of the "crotal" lichens, was traditionally used for dyeing wool and fabric. The dye produced from U. torrefacta yields a range of colours, including purplish-red and greyish-magenta hues, depending on the dyeing process and mordants used. The fermentation method involves soaking the lichen in an ammonia solution for several weeks to produce rich red and purple dyes. These colours were highly valued and often used in traditional Scottish tartans and textiles. The dyeing process using U. torrefacta and similar lichens was integral to the textile traditions of the Scottish Highlands. Lichen dyes were known for their vibrant and long-lasting colours, essential for creating the vivid hues seen in Highland dress.
