= Ohm (disambiguation) =

Ohm (symbol Ω) is a unit of electrical resistance named after Georg Ohm.

Ohm or OHM may also refer to:

== People ==
- Georg Ohm (1789–1854), German physicist and namesake of the term ohm
- Germán Ohm (born 1936), Mexican boxer
- Jörg Ohm (1944–2020), former East German football player
- Martin Ohm (1792–1872), German mathematician
- Rebecca Ohm, United States Air Force officer and fighter pilot
- Rune Ohm (born 1980), Danish handball player
- Thorsten Ohm, CEO of VDM Publishing
- Pawat Chittsawangdee, Thai actor, nicknamed Ohm
- Thitiwat Ritprasert, Thai actor, nicknamed Ohm

== Places ==
=== Germany ===
- Ohm (river), right tributary of the Lahn near Cölbe
- Zwester Ohm, left tributary of the Lahn near Fronhausen

=== Outer space ===
- 24750 Ohm, an outer main belt asteroid
- Ohm (crater) on the Moon

== Science and technology ==
- Acoustic ohm, a unit of measurement of acoustic impedance
- Ohm's law, law that relates electrical resistance, current, and voltage
- OHM (Observe. Hack. Make.), a 2013 outdoor hacker conference
- OpenHistoricalMap, a collaboratively edited historical atlas of the world

== Media and entertainment ==
=== Music ===
- OHM (band), a rock/jazz fusion music group
- OHM: The Early Gurus of Electronic Music, 2000 album
- Ohms (album), a 2020 album by Deftones
- "Ohm", song by indie band Yo La Tengo from the album Fade
- “Ohm Sweet Ohm”, song by German band Kraftwerk from the album “Radio-Activity”
- "Ohm", a song by metalcore band Northlane from the album Node
- The Oxford History of Music (OHM), an early 20th-century history of Western classical music

=== Fictional entities ===
- Ohm (One Piece), a character in the Japanese manga and anime
- Johnny Ohm, a Marvel Comics supervillain
- Ohm, a character from the Air Gear manga
- Ohm, a race of arthropodean creatures, also "Ohmu", from the film Nausicaä of the Valley of the Wind

=== Other uses in media ===
- Organisatie Hindoe Media, a Dutch public broadcaster
- Ohm Krüger, a 1941 German biographical film

== Other uses ==
- Alternative spelling for Om, a sacred sound and symbol of several Indian religions
- Alternative spelling for the Korean name Um
- Orange Heritage Museum, refers to two Orange Order museums; Sloan's House and Schomberg House

== See also ==
- Ohms (disambiguation)
- Aum (disambiguation)
- Om (disambiguation)
- Omu (disambiguation)
