= Om (disambiguation) =

Om is a sacred syllable in Jainism, Hinduism, Buddhism, and Sikhism.

OM, om, ॐ, and variations, may also refer to:

== Arts and entertainment ==
=== Fiction ===
- Om (1995 film), an Indian Kannada-language film
- Om (2003 film), an Indian Hindi-language film
- Om (2018 film), an Indian Tamil-language film
- Rashtra Kavach Om, or Om: The Battle Within, 2022 film by Kapil Verma
- Om, one of the interpreted titles of Super (2010 Indian film)
- Om, the lead character in the 2007 Bollywood film Om Shanti Om
- Om, any one of the humans in the 1973 animated film Fantastic Planet
- O.M: Operation Mole, previous titled Om, upcoming 2026 Indian Tamil-language film

=== Music ===
- Om (band), a doom metal band
- Om (Ibarra album), a 1996 album
- Om (John Coltrane album), a 1965 album
- OM (Negură Bunget album), a 2006 album
- Om (Soulfly album), a 2002 album also known as 3
- "Om" (The Moody Blues song), 1968
- Om (Niklas Strömstedt song), 1990
- OM Festival, a Canadian electronic music festival
- Om Records, a San Francisco-based dance music record label, home to artist like J Boogie, Kaskade, and King Kooba
- Of Machines, a post-hardcore band
- Orchestra Model, an acoustic guitar by Martin Guitars

=== People ===
- Om Bhatia, Indian actor better known as Akshay Kumar
- Om Bhutkar, Indian actor
- Om Puri, Indian actor
- Om Sahani, Indian actor

=== Sport ===
- Olympique de Marseille (OM), a French football club

== Businesses and organizations ==
- MIAT-Mongolian Airlines (IATA code OM)
- Odyssey of the Mind, an international problem-solving competition for students
- Officine Meccaniche, a former Italian motor vehicle manufacturer
- Operation Mobilisation, a Christian non-profit missions organization
- OM AB, a Swedish exchange which merged with Finnish HEX plc to become OMX
- Rede OM Brasil, a defunct Brazilian television network
- OM Digital Solutions Corporation, a Japanese manufacturer of opto-digital products
- Officine Meccaniche (O.M.), an Italian motor manufacturer

== Honors and orders ==
- Order of Manitoba, the post-nominal letters indicating membership in an honour of the Crown in Right of Manitoba
- Order of Merit, post-nominal letters indicating membership in a high honour from the monarch of the Commonwealth realms
- Order of Merit (Jamaica), post-nominal letters indicating membership of the Order of Merit in the Jamaican honours system
- Order of the Minims, the post-nominal letters indicating membership in a Roman Catholic religious order founded by Francis of Paola in the fifteenth century in Italy

== Language ==
- Oromo language (ISO 639-1: "om")
- Oto-Manguean languages (abbreviated as "OM")

== Places ==
- Øm Abbey, a Cistercian abbey which was in Søhøjlandet, in Denmark
- Om (river), a tributary of the Irtysh in Siberia, Russia
- Oman (ISO 3166 country code OM)
  - .om, the country code top level domain (ccTLD) for Oman
- Omu Peak, in the Bucegi Mountains of Romania

== Science and technology ==
=== Biology and medicine ===
- Occupational medicine, a medical specialty
- Osteomyelitis, a bone marrow infection
- Otitis media, an infection of the middle ear
- Bacterial outer membrane, a layer found in gram-negative bacteria

=== Computing and telecommunications ===
- .om, the country code top level domain (ccTLD) for Oman
- Openmoko Linux, a mobile operating system developed by the Openmoko project

=== Other uses in science and technology ===
- Builder's Old Measurement (abbr. OM or om) - a method of calculating tonnage (i.e. cargo capacity) for merchant ships in the age of sail
- Olympus OM system, a family of Olympus SLR cameras made between 1972 and 2002
- Organic matter
- Osipkov–Merritt models, mathematical representations of spherical stellar systems

== Other uses ==
- Minim (religious order) (O.M.), is a member of the Roman Catholic religious order of friars
- Offering memorandum, in finance, "the OM", prospectus for a bond offering
- Old Man, meaning a male amateur radio operator
- List of Old Marlburians, alumni of Marlborough College
- Old Millfieldians, alumni of Millfield School
- Om family, eastern Bengali family
- Operating margin, in business
- Operation Mindfuck, a practice within Discordianism
- Orgasmic meditation, a female masturbation activity promoted by OneTaste
- Pakpilai Thavisin (born 1960), nicknamed Om, Thai physician, businesswoman and wife of Srettha Thavisin, Prime Minister of Thailand

== See also ==
- Aum (disambiguation)
- Omkara (disambiguation)
- O&M (disambiguation)
- OAM (disambiguation)
- Ohm (disambiguation)
- OMS (disambiguation)
- Omu (disambiguation)
- Aum Shinrikyo, a Japanese new religious movement, known for carrying out the Sarin gas attacks in the Tokyo subways
