= OAM =

OAM may refer to:

== Science and technology ==
- Object access method, a function available in IBM's z/OS
- OCP Accelerator Module, a computer hardware design specification published by the Open Compute Project
- Operations, administration, and management, processes involved in maintaining a system, often a computer system
- Oracle Access Manager, a software component of the Oracle Identity Management software suite
- Orbital angular momentum (disambiguation) in physics

== Other uses ==
- Medal of the Order of Australia, an Australian national honour
- Oamaru Aerodrome, New Zealand
- Observatorio Astronómico de Mallorca, an observatory in Spain
- Office of Alternative Medicine, a U.S. government agency whose duties have been taken over by the National Center for Complementary and Alternative Medicine
- Office of Air and Marine, a federal law enforcement agency within the U.S. Customs and Border Protection
- Official Museums of Amsterdam, Netherlands
- On a Mission (disambiguation)
- OverActive Media, an esports and entertainment company
- Ozy and Millie, a furry webcomic
