= The Sciences of the Artificial =

1969 book by Herbert A. Simon

- Author: Herbert A. Simon
- Subjects: science, philosophy
- Genres: non-fiction
- Published: 1969 (hbk); 1970 (pbk)
- Publisher: The MIT Press
- Publication place: Cambridge, MA
- ISBN: 9780262190510

The Sciences of the Artificial (1969) is a book by Herbert A. Simon in the domain of the learning sciences and artificial intelligence; it is especially influential in design theory. The book is themed around how artificial phenomena ought to be categorized, discussing as to whether such phenomena belong within the domain of 'science'.

It has been reviewed many times in scientific literature—including as a special column in The Journal of the Learning Sciences.

The book was followed by two later editions—in 1981 and in 1996—in which Simon broadened the scope of his discussions.

== Background ==
During the 1950s and 1960s, an expanse of literature was published that demonstrated broad interest in treating design as a rigorous and systematic discipline in hopes of establishing design as a science. Primarily through the fields of operational research and Organisation & Methods, these academics purposed to make design compatible with the related disciplines of management science and operations management.

This trend would bring about the "design methods movement" of the 1960s, serving as the backdrop under which Simon wrote the article "Architecture of Complexity" (1962), which would later become The Sciences of the Artificial (1969). In his work, Simon had the broader intention of unifying the social sciences.

== Overview ==
The theme of the book is how ought artificial phenomena be categorized, discussing as to whether such phenomena belong within the domain of 'science'.

Intending to demonstrate that it is possible for there to be an empirical science of 'artificial' phenomena in addition to that of 'natural' phenomena, Simon argues that designed systems are a valid field of study. The distinction Simon provides between the 'artificial' and the 'natural' is that artificial things are synthetic, and characterized in terms of functions, goals, and adaptation.

Simon characterizes an artificial system as an interface that links two environments—inner and outer. Therefore, artificial systems are susceptible to change because they are contingent upon their environment, i.e. the circumstances in which they are in. Moreover, these environments exist in the realm of 'natural science', while the interface is the realm of 'artificial science'.

To Simon, science of the 'artificial' is the science of 'design'; the sciences of the artificial are relevant to "all fields that create designs to perform tasks or fulfill goals and functions." Moreover:

Engineering, medicine, business, architecture, and painting are concerned not with the necessary but with the contingent – not with how things are but with how they might be – in short, with design.

Such fields also include those of cognitive psychology, linguistics, economics, management/administration, and education. As such, Simon explores the commonalities of artificial systems including economic systems, business firms, artificial intelligence, complex engineering projects, and social plans.

The book ultimately provides an information-processing theory of humanity's thinking processes as an operational, empirically based alternative to behaviorism.

== Influence ==
The book influenced Elinor Ostrom.
