= Roßdorf =

- Municipality
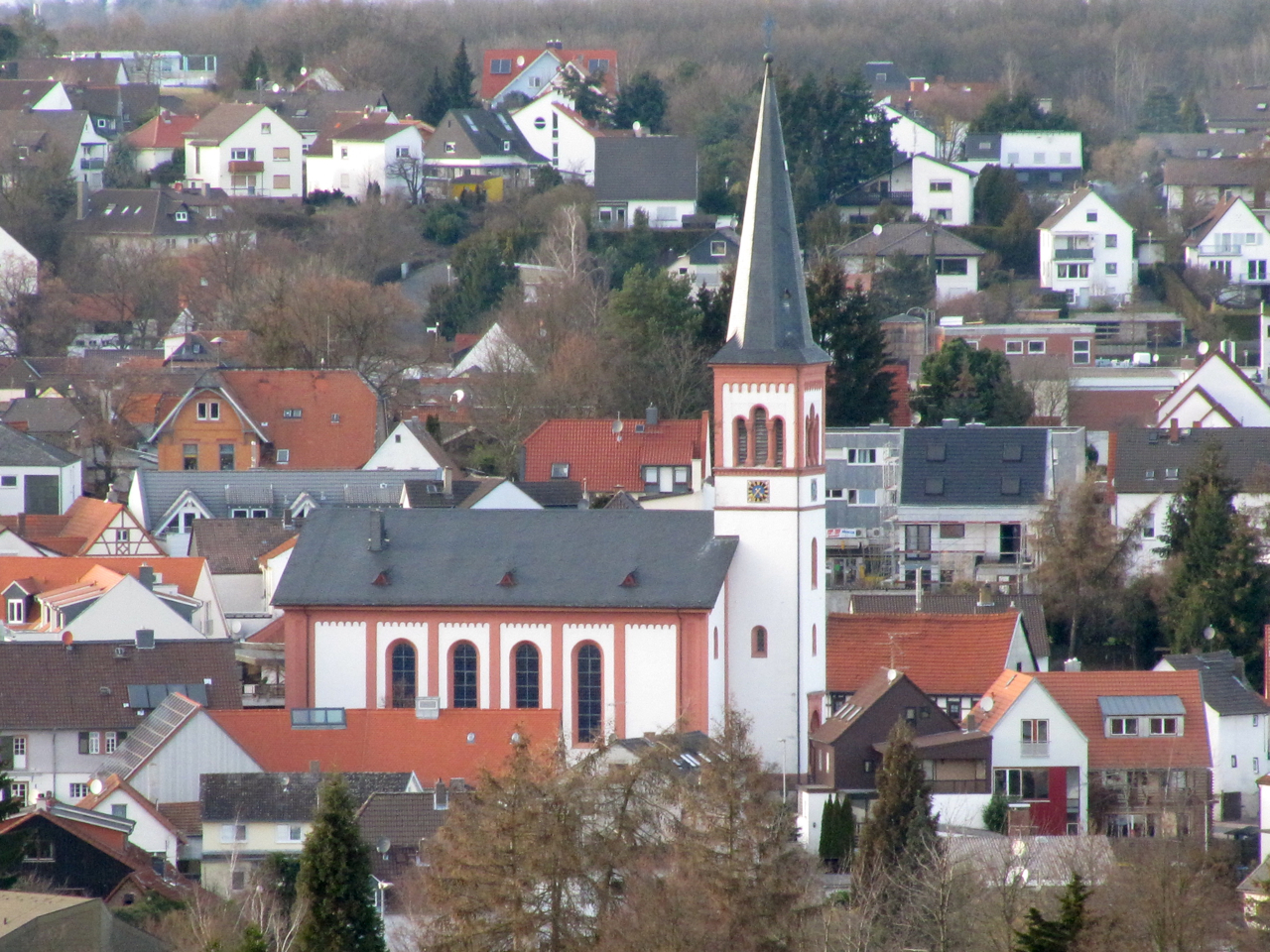
- Protestant church

- Coat of arms

- Location of Roßdorf within Darmstadt-Dieburg district
- Interactive map of Roßdorf
- Location within Germany Location within Hesse
- Coordinates: 49°51′N 08°45′E
- Country: Germany
- State: Hesse
- Admin. region: Darmstadt
- District: Darmstadt-Dieburg
- Subdivisions: Roßdorf and Gundernhausen

Government
  - Mayor (2022–28): Norman Zimmermann

Area
  - Total: 20.6 km^{2} (8.0 sq mi)
- Elevation: 197 m (646 ft)

Population (2025-12-31)
  - Total: 13,025
  - Density: 632/km^{2} (1,640/sq mi)
- Time zone: UTC+01:00 (CET)
  - Summer (DST): UTC+02:00 (CEST)
- Postal codes: 64380
- Dialling codes: 06154, 06071
- Vehicle registration: DA
- Website: www.rossdorf.de

Roßdorf (German pronunciation: [ˈʁɔsdɔʁf]) is a municipality in the district of Darmstadt-Dieburg, in Hesse, Germany. It has a population of 12,619 (as of 2020). It is situated 8 km east of Darmstadt.

== Geographic situation ==
=== Neighbouring towns and municipalities ===
Roßdorf borders in the north and east on the municipality of Groß-Zimmern, in the southeast on the town of Reinheim, in the south on the town of Ober-Ramstadt, and in the west on the city of Darmstadt.

=== Structure of the municipality ===
The Municipality of Roßdorf is divided into two parts: Gundernhausen and Roßdorf.

== History ==
The first official mention of Roßdorf is in the year 1250. At this time, Abbot Heinrich vested Counts Diether and Eberhardt I of Katzenelnbogen with the villages of Roßdorf and Gundernhausen. In 1479, the family line died out and the inheritance went to Landgrave Heinrich III of Hesse.

In 1621, Bavarian soldiers took up quarters in Roßdorf and plundered the town. In addition, witch-hunts took place, during which the inhabitants were accused of witchcraft. The worst period for Roßdorf was in the years 1634/35, during the Thirty Years' War. The forces of the Holy Roman Empire and Sweden opposed each other in the region, each in turn laying waste to and scavenging the entire countryside and heavily decimating the population. In the summer of 1635, the plague broke out, reducing the number of inhabitants to 50. In 1672, during the Franco-Dutch War, Louis XIV's troops took up quarters. In 1814, Russian soldiers passed through on their way to France.

In 1852, Roßdorf was incorporated into the district of Darmstadt. Since 1977, amalgamated with its neighbour Gundernhausen, it has belonged to the district of Darmstadt-Dieburg.

== Population ==
=== Demographic development ===
- 1575: 500 inhabitants
- 1635: 50 inhabitants
- 1814: 200 inhabitants
- 2003: 12,114 inhabitants
- 2005: 12,434 inhabitants
- 2007: 12,169 inhabitants
- 2015: 12,146 inhabitants

== Politics ==
=== Municipal council ===
The communal election of 26 March 2006 returned the following result (compared to the result from 2001):

Parties and groups of independent candidates		% 2006	Seats; 2006	% 2001	Seats; 2001
SPD	Social Democratic Party of Germany	51.8	16	55.6	17
CDU	Christian Democratic Union (Germany)	26.6	8	30.2	9
GRÜNE	Alliance '90/The Greens	13.7	4	14.3	5
FDP	Free Democratic Party (Germany)	7.9	3	–	–
Total		100.0	31	100.0	31
Voter turnout in %		51.9		56.4	

=== Mayor ===
- Heinrich Kloß (SPD, 1954–1982)
- Alfred Jakoubek (SPD, 1982–1997)
- Manfred Pfeiffer (SPD, 1997–2003)
- Christel Sprößler (SPD, since 2003)

=== Coat of arms ===
The coat of arms consists of a shield with blue background. At the centre is a silver moon, over which a golden horseshoe hangs. Underneath these, there is a silver rose, the centre of which is blue. The remaining free space is taken up by seven golden stars (five in the upper area, two in the lower area). The coat of arms was approved by the president of the regional government in 1952.

The coat of arms is based on the seal of the combined village court of Roßdorf and Gundernhausen. An imprint of this seal can be found on the so-called "Mansfeld Catalogue of Damages" from 1625, which is kept in the National Archive in Darmstadt. This Catalogue lists the losses suffered by the subjects of the Counts of Katzenelnbogen during the Thirty Years' War. In the 1950s, a face was added to the moon on the coat of arms, a move which has been criticised by many of Roßdorf's inhabitants.

=== Twinnings ===
- Vösendorf in Austria
- Reggello in Italy
- Kindberg in Austria
- Benátky nad Jizerou in the Czech Republic
- Roßdorf in the Rhön region of Thuringia, Germany
- Lichtentanne in the district of Zwickau, in Saxony, Germany

== Culture and tourist attractions ==
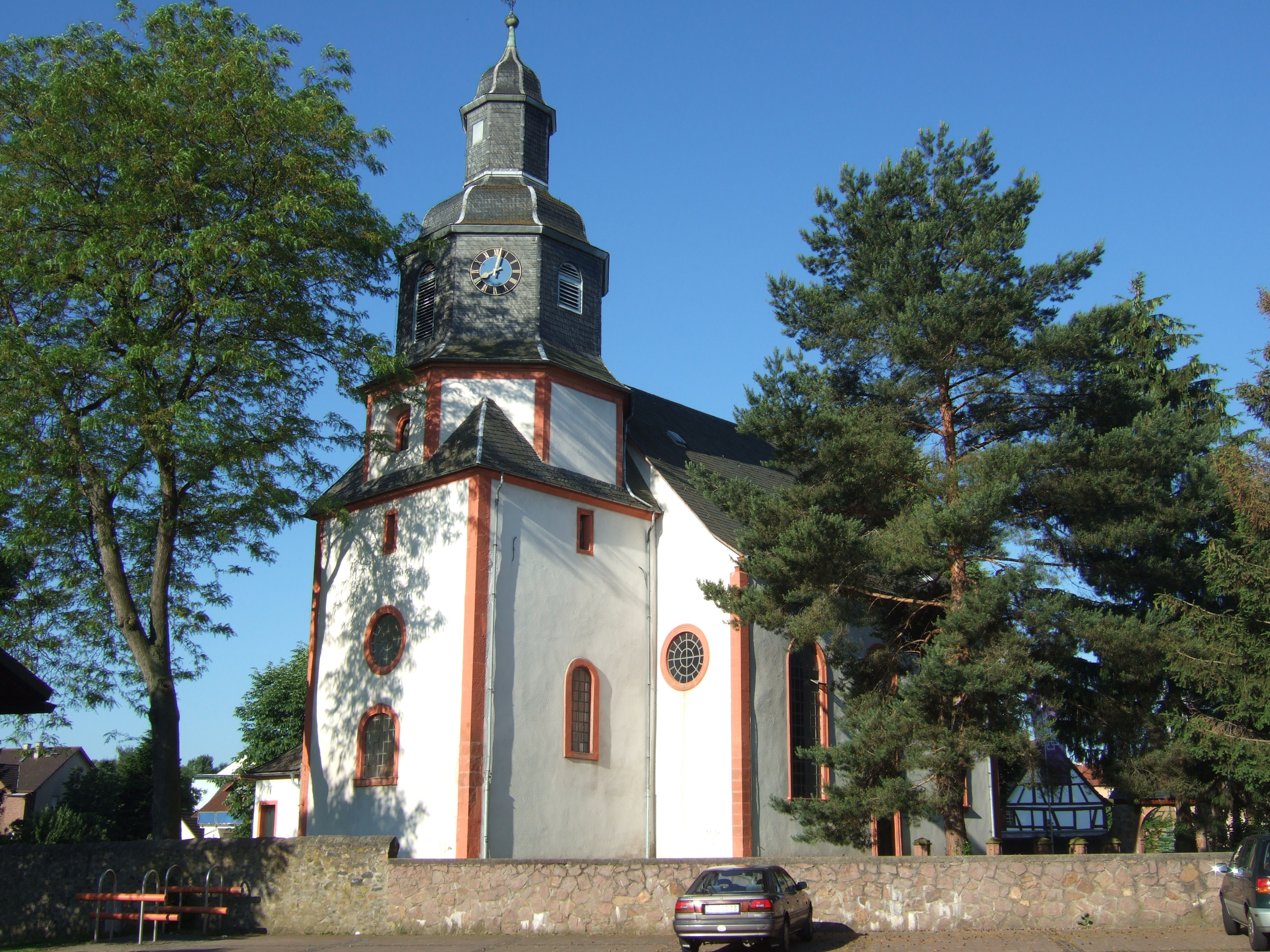
The Protestant church in Gundernhausen

- In Roßdorf, there is a Catholic and a Protestant church; in Gundernhausen there is a Protestant church
- The historic town hall (Rathaus) dates from the year 1575
- The Museum of Skilled Trades in Southern Hesse (Südhessische Handwerksmuseum) is located in the old train station (Alter Bahnhof)
- From the summit cross of the "Rehberg", one can take in the view for a great distance in the directions of Aschaffenburg and Frankfurt
- Roßdorf has a large heated outdoor swimming pool
- Adjoining the outdoor swimming pool, there is a roller skating rink, which is used in winter as an ice rink

Roßdorf is famous for horse breeding and in recent years has produced several prize-winning riders.

=== Clubs and associations ===
The largest club in Roßdorf is the Sport and Cultural Association (Sport- und Kulturgemeinde - SKG - Roßdorf 1877 e.V.)

Roßdorf is also the headquarters of the Gesellschaft zur wissenschaftlichen Untersuchung von Parawissenschaften (GWUP; "Society for the Scientific Investigation of Parasciences"), the European Council of Skeptical Organisations (ECSO) and the Center for Inquiry-Europe.

== Transport infrastructure ==
Roßdorf is connected to the Bundesstraße B 26 by three motorway exits. The B 26 has interchanges in Darmstadt with the Autobahns A 5 and A 67 and in Aschaffenburg with the A 3. Roßdorf is also the starting point of the B 38.

In addition, a number of bus routes serve Roßdorf:

- NH: Darmstadt – Roßdorf – Reinheim – Ueberau/Groß-Bieberau – Niedernhausen
- RH: Darmstadt – Roßdorf – Reinheim
- MO 1: Darmstadt – Roßdorf – Ober-Ramstadt – Asbach/Modautal – Nieder-Modau
- 672: Darmstadt – Roßdorf – Gundernhausen – Groß-Zimmern – Dieburg
- 673: Darmstadt – Roßdorf – Gundernhausen Stetteritz
- 693: Darmstadt – Roßdorf – Reinheim – Gr.-Bieberau – Brensbach – Reichelsheim – Fürth (not all buses serve Fürth)

The railway line "Darmstadt Ost – Groß-Zimmern" served Roßdorf and neighboring towns until passenger service was discontinued in June 1966. The track between the train stops Darmstadt Ost and Bessunger Forsthaus still exists and was occasionally used for historical train rides until 2016, while the rest of the line between Darmstadt and Groß-Zimmern has been dismantled.

== Notable people ==
- Klaus Teuber (1952-2023), inventor of The Settlers of Catan; probably the best known German board game designer
- Markus Rühl (born 1972), bodybuilder
- Yannick Lebherz (born 1989), swimmer
- André Greipel, road sprinter (cycling)
- Vanessa Neumann (born 1990), racing driver and model

== Companies ==
- Envirochemie GmbH – a company that designs and manufactures wastewater treatment facilities

== Literature ==
Mein Dorf, Heinz Friedrich, Munich 1996, ISBN 3-442-72052-4, (available only in German language)
