= O&M =

The abbreviation O&M can stand for:

== Organizations ==
- Ogilvy and Mather, an advertising, marketing, and public relations agency
- Ohio and Mississippi Railway
- Ovens & Murray Football League
- Owens & Minor, a healthcare logistics company

== Other uses ==
- Observations and Measurements, in information science
- Operations and maintenance
- Organization and Methods (management)
- Orientation and mobility, training for visually impaired people
