= Umbilicaria semitensis =

Scientific classification
- Kingdom: Fungi
- Division: Ascomycota
- Class: Lecanoromycetes
- Order: Umbilicariales
- Family: Umbilicariaceae
- Genus: Umbilicaria
- Species: U. semitensis

Binomial name
- Umbilicaria semitensis Tuck. (1872)

Species of lichen

Umbilicaria semitensis, commonly known as Yosemite rock tripe, is a species of foliose lichen in the family Umbilicariaceae. It occurs in the western regions of northern North America, from southern California to southern Oregon.

== Taxonomy ==
Umbilicaria semitensis was first described by Edward Tuckerman in 1872 from a specimen collected at Yosemite National Park. Initially recognized as a distinct species, it was later synonymized under Umbilicaria angulata due to their similar thallus appearances and overlapping geographical ranges. However, analyses of the ITS and LSU regions of nrDNA have supported the re-establishment of U. semitensis as a distinct species, primarily distinguished by its muriform spores, in contrast to the simple spores of U. angulata.

The type specimen of Umbilicaria angulata was collected in California, specifically in Monterey, by Archibald Menzies. Although the specimen is labeled as collected in Monterey, the exact locality remains uncertain due to the extensive travels of Menzies along the north Pacific coast, where U. angulata is commonly found. This has led to speculation that the type locality might be mislabeled. Historical attempts to relocate Menzies' collecting sites near Monterey to find Umbilicaria angulata have been unsuccessful, suggesting that further investigation using Menzies' journals might be necessary to clarify the original collecting location.

The lichen's epithet semitensis is derived from the Latinized form of "Yosemite", referring to its type locality in Yosemite Valley. Molecular studies have further confirmed the distinct genetic identity of Umbilicaria semitensis, separating it from U. angulata and other related species within its range.

== Description ==
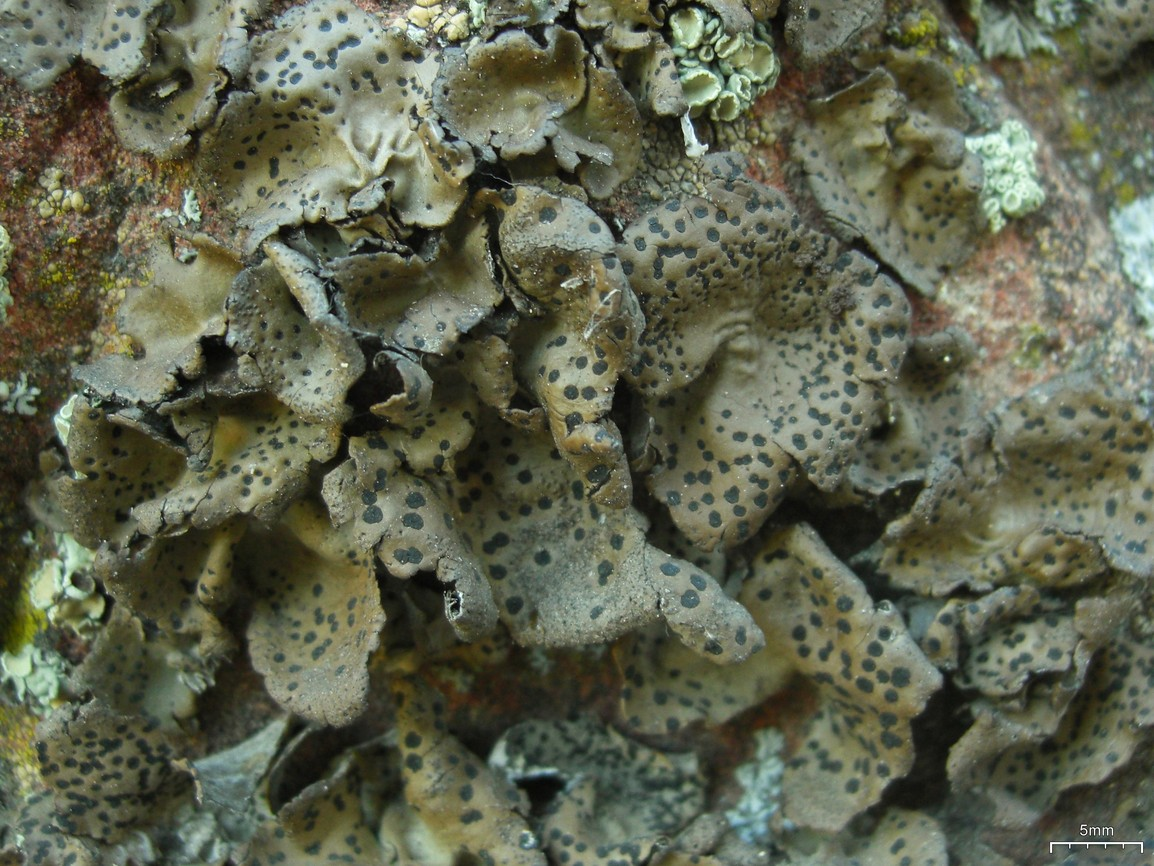
Umbilicaria semtiensis was previously considered synonymous with its lookalike Umbilicaria angulata, shown here.

Umbilicaria semitensis is characterized by its large, rounded, and often overlapping lobes. The thallus of the lichen is adnate to loosely adnate, typically ranging from 7–15 cm (2.8–5.9 in) in diameter. Its lobes are contiguous to overlapping and imbricate, with a surface texture that is pale greenish-grey to whitish-grey and shiny. As the lichen ages, its surface becomes finely foveolate and can develop reticulate cracks.

This lichen has numerous laminal pseudocyphellae, which are mainly linear to irregularly shaped. The older parts of the thallus densely develop cylindrical, simple to branched isidia, which are reproductive propagules. The rhizines on the lower surface are moderately abundant, ranging from simple to furcately branched, and are not squarrose.

Apothecia are quite common in Umbilicaria semitensis, appearing more or less pedicellate with a disc that is concave and thalline exciple that is often sparsely isidiate. The ascospores are broadly ellipsoid, measuring between 17–18 by 12–13 μm.

== Habitat and distribution ==
Umbilicaria semitensis is found growing on rocky substrates, particularly in montane and subalpine regions. It ranges from southern California through to southern Oregon, growing at elevations from approximately 7,000 to 8,000 ft (2,100 to 2,400 m). The lichen prefers exposed, somewhat sheltered locations on rock surfaces, often above the Yosemite Valley.
