= Omu =

Omu or OMU may refer to:

- Ōmu, Hokkaido, a town in Hokkaido
- Omu Peak, a mountain in Romania
- Omu Okwei (1872–1943), Nigerian queen merchant
- Paul Omu (1940–2025), military governor of South-Eastern State, Nigeria
- Stella Omu (born 1946), Nigerian politician who was elected as national Senator on the People's Democratic Party
- Ohmu, a type of creature from Hayao Miyazaki's Nausicaa of the Valley of the Wind
- Osaka Metropolitan University
- Owensboro Municipal Utilities

== See also ==
- Om (disambiguation)
- Ohm (disambiguation)
- Omoo
