= Omkara =

Omkara or onkara can mean:

- A name for the sound or syllable Om, or its corresponding character in Indian scripts, considered sacred in major Indian religions
  - Used to denote Brahman in some Hindu texts
- Omkara (2004 film), a 2004 Indian Kannada film
- Omkara (2006 film), a 2006 Indian Hindi film adapted from the William Shakespeare play Othello
- Omkaram (TV series), an Indian Telugu-language television series

== See also ==
- Om (disambiguation)
- Aum (disambiguation)
- Omkaram, 1997 Indian film
- Ik Onkar, supreme reality in Sikhism
- Omkar, a fictional horror character created by Indian writer Narayan Dharap
