= Gundernhausen =

- Ortsteil of Roßdorf
- Coat of arms
- Interactive map of Gundernhausen
- Location within Germany Location within Hesse
- Coordinates: 49°52′N 08°47′E
- Country: Germany
- State: Hesse
- Admin. region: Darmstadt
- District: Darmstadt-Dieburg
- Municipality: Roßdorf

Area
  - Total: 6.74 km^{2} (2.60 sq mi)
- Elevation: 157 m (515 ft)

Population (2016-12-31)
  - Total: 3,512
  - Density: 521/km^{2} (1,350/sq mi)
- Time zone: UTC+01:00 (CET)
  - Summer (DST): UTC+02:00 (CEST)
- Postal codes: 64380
- Dialling codes: 06071
- Vehicle registration: DA, DI

Gundernhausen (German pronunciation: [ɡʊndɐnˈhaʊ̯zn̩], in local dialect: Gunnehause) is a town in the municipality of Roßdorf in the district of Darmstadt-Dieburg, in Hesse, Germany.

== Geography ==
The town is located approximately five kilometers south-west of Dieburg and few kilometers west of Groß-Zimmern in the historic region Bachgau. In the opposite direction, it lies north-east and close by to Roßdorf, the other town comprising the municipality, and approximately ten kilometers east of Darmstadt.

The surrounding area around Gundernhausen consists almost entirely of farmland, including several farms. Further up north is the southern end of the Oberwald forest. While most of inhabited area has an elevation of 150 – 160 meters, the southern part of the town is situated on a small hill called Stetteritz, an elevated area rising up to around 55m above the rest of the village.

== History ==
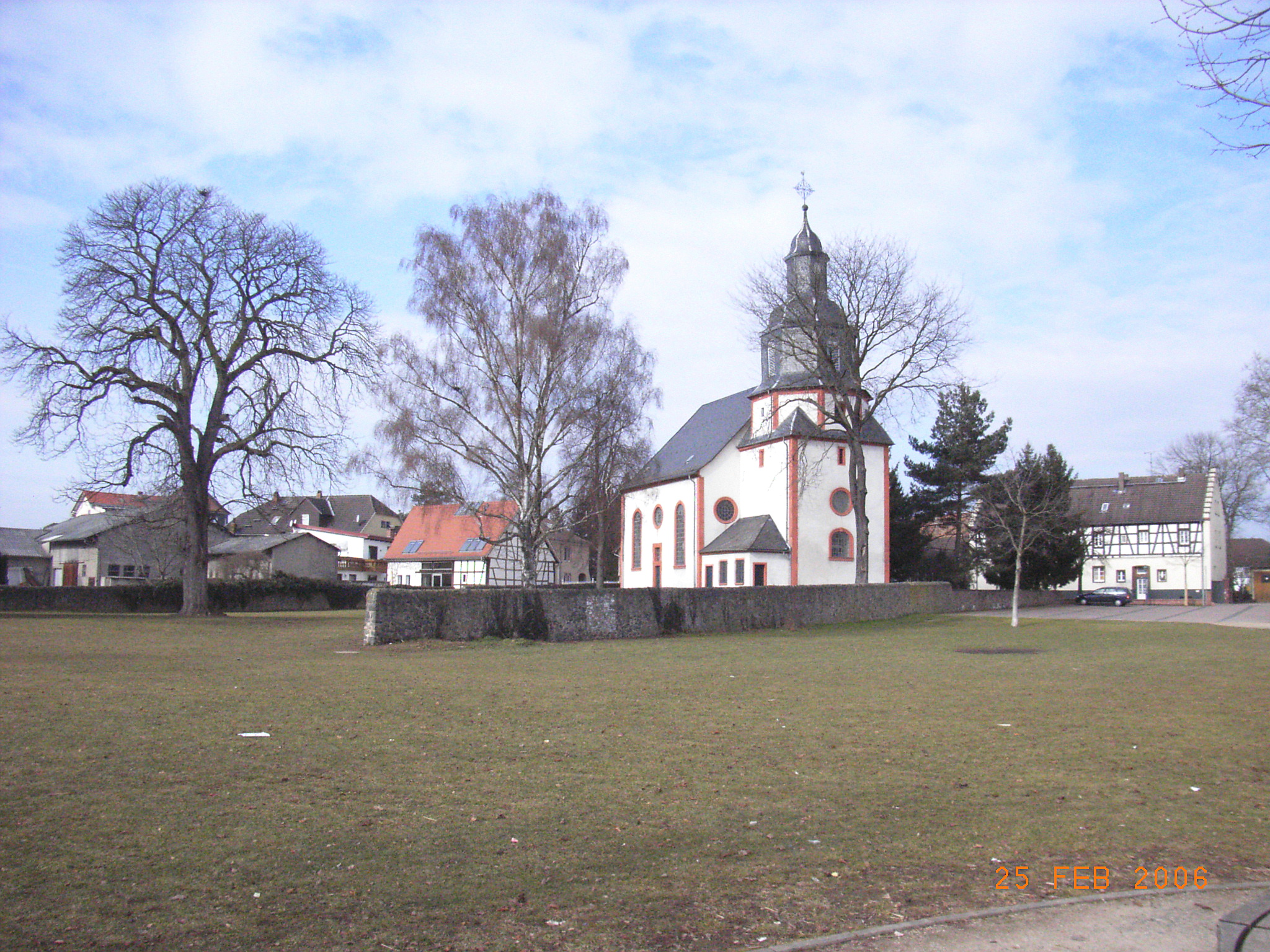
The church in Gundernhausen (2006)

Archeological findings suggest that the area of Gundernhausen has been inhabited for over a millennium. Partly because of the name ...hausen, it is presumed that the settlement was first established in the 8th or 9th century.

The first mention of the full town name Gunthershusen can be found in a document of the Abbey of Fulda from the year 1250. These historic documents reference the town with various similar names that changed over the centuries. Among others, the town was known as Gunderadeshusen (1318), Gunderdehusen (1423), Gundelhusen (1453), Gondernhusen (1492), and Gondernhaußen (1671).

At the end of the 14th century, disputes between the Counts of Katzenelnbogen and the city of Worms resulted in significant damage to the county. Documents from 1390 record that seven ohms of wine were stolen from Kunz Ulrich von Gundernhausen. This indicates winemaking activities around Gundernhausen.

In 1479, with the passing of the Counts of Katzenelnbogen, Gundernhausen was transferred to the Landgraviate of Hesse. Together with the latter, Gundernhausen became protestant in 1526. The bell of the town's protestant church, cast in 1520 and called Anna, remains to this day. Gundernhausen, which originally belonged to the church of Lengfeld, received its own parish in 1412.

In the Thirty Years' War, Gundernhausen was severely damaged twice. It was looted by troops of the House of Mansfeld in 1622, and around 1636 swedish troops camped at what is still called Schwedenrain today. The subsequent plague killed almost the entire population, and the damaged town was uninhabited for years. The oldest preserved church register was started in 1599 by pastor Theoderich Kraft Weidling and ended in 1634 after he died from the plague. After the war, the town was slowly reinhabited, driven by the two farms located in the area.

Between the 18th and 19th century, French and other troops were quartered there. In 1813, the Dieburger Mark, referring to a large area comprising many different towns, was dissolved, and Gundernhausen was granted communal forest in proportion to its population at that time.

In 1863, the first club was founded, a beekeeping association. This was followed up by several singing clubs (1865), a gymnastics club (1905), and a rabbit breeding club (1912). Today, the town has many more clubs founded over the years. Gundernhausen was connected to the railway network in 1897 with the first passenger train serving the Gundernhausen train station. The first electric lighting was installed in 1913 and public water supply was established in 1934.

Like all German towns, Gundernhausen also suffered from the Second World War, with 102 casualties in the town. The war was over for Gundernhausen after the invasion of American troops on March 25, 1945. Between 1946 and 1955, Gundernhausen took in over 400 displaced people due to the war; the town changed, new development areas were constructed, the population doubled, a new school was established, and land consolidation done in 1957 changed the landscape. Many more developments followed over the decades.

At the beginning of 1977, Gundernhausen became part of the municipality of Roßdorf, as part of a regional reform in Hesse, which also established the district of Darmstadt-Dieburg.

=== Administrative History ===
The following list shows the administrative subdivisions that Gundernhausen belonged to:

- before 1479: Holy Roman Empire, County of Katzenelnbogen, Upper County of Katzenelnbogen
- since 1479: Holy Roman Empire, Landgraviate of Hesse (through inheritance), Upper County of Katzenelnbogen
- since 1567: Holy Roman Empire, Landgraviate of Hesse-Darmstadt, Upper County of Katzenelnbogen, (1791: Amt Lichtenberg, Zent Oberramstadt, Roßdorfer Reiswagen)
- since 1803: Holy Roman Empire, Landgraviate of Hesse-Darmstadt, Principality of Starkenburg, Amt Lichtenberg
- since 1806: Grand Duchy of Hesse, Principality of Starkenburg, Amt Lichtenberg
- since 1815: Grand Duchy of Hesse, Province of Starkenburg, Amt Lichtenberg
- since 1821: Grand Duchy of Hesse, Province of Starkenburg, Landratsbezirk Reinheim
- since 1832: Grand Duchy of Hesse, Province of Starkenburg, Dieburg district
- since 1848: Grand Duchy of Hesse, Regierungsbezirk Dieburg
- since 1852: Grand Duchy of Hesse, Province of Starkenburg, Dieburg district
- since 1871: German Empire, Grand Duchy of Hesse, Province of Starkenburg, Dieburg district
- since 1918: German Empire, People's State of Hesse, Province of Starkenburg, Dieburg district
- since 1938: German Empire, People's State of Hesse, Landkreis Dieburg
- since 1945: German Empire, American occupation zone in Germany, Greater Hesse, Regierungsbezirk Darmstadt, Landkreis Dieburg
- since 1946: German Empire, American occupation zone in Germany, Hesse, Regierungsbezirk Darmstadt, Landkreis Dieburg
- since 1949: Federal Republic of Germany, Hesse, Regierungsbezirk Darmstadt, Landkreis Dieburg
- since 1977: Federal Republic of Germany, Hesse, Regierungsbezirk Darmstadt, Landkreis Darmstadt-Dieburg, Roßdorf Municipality

=== Demographic Development ===
Historical population
Year	Pop.	±%
1791	464	—
1800	498	+7.3%
1806	540	+8.4%
1829	753	+39.4%
1867	872	+15.8%
1871	868	−0.5%
1895	908	+4.6%
1910	1,020	+12.3%
1939	1,124	+10.2%
1946	1,712	+52.3%
1961	1,754	+2.5%
1967	2,443	+39.3%
1970	2,584	+5.8%
2011	3,126	+21.0%
2016	3,512	+12.3%

== Coat of Arms ==

Blazon: "Ein Schild in Blau, unter einem silbernen sechszackigen Stern ein aufwärtsgekehrt liegender goldener Halbmond, an dem ein silbernes Hufeisen hängt". This approximately translates to "A blue shield; under a silver six-pointed star [there is] an upward-facing golden crescent, from which a silver horseshoe hangs". The coat of arms contains elements from the seal of the Roßdorf and Gundernhausen joint village court from the 19th century.

An official flag was never approved. However, there exists an unofficial flag, which is the coat of arms on a white-red-quartered background.

== Regular Events ==
- July: Parkfest
- September: An important event of the town is the Kermesse (Kerb), first mentioned in 1599. It takes place for four days starting on the first sunday in September, and is celebrated by all inhabitants.
- November/December: christmas market

== Transport Infrastructure ==
The train station Gundernhausen was part of the railway line "Darmstadt Ost – Groß-Zimmern", opened in 1897. Passenger transport service was discontinued on June 1, 1966, and the line is now closed. A part of the track, between the train stops Darmstadt Ost and Bessunger Forsthaus, still exists and was occasionally used for historical train rides until 2016, falling into disrepair ever since. The rest of the line has been dismantled and its route is now partially occupied by footpaths or private property, including the former location of the Gundernhausen station.

Gundernhausen is connected through a dedicated motorway exit to the B26 highway in both directions of Darmstadt and Dieburg. It is also connected to the B38 on the side facing Darmstadt.

In addition, three bus routes run from or through Gundernhausen:

- 672: Darmstadt – Roßdorf – Gundernhausen Hauptstraße – Groß-Zimmern – Dieburg
- 673: Darmstadt – Roßdorf – Gundernhausen Stetteritz
- X78: Darmstadt – Gundernhausen Aussiedlerhöfe (remote) – Groß-Zimmern – Klein-Zimmern – Semd
