= Aum (disambiguation) =

Aum, or Om, is an Indian mantra and spiritual symbol.

Aum or AUM may also refer to:

== Art, entertainment and media ==
- Audiological Medicine (SUAM), a peer-reviewed medical journal
- August Underground's Mordum, a 2003 exploitation film
- Aum!, a 2021 Indonesian adventure mockumentary film
- TeenSet, a former American magazine rebranded AUM in 1969
- AUM, a magazine and an imprint AUM Publications by Sri Chinmoy's organization

=== Music ===
- "Aum", a track from the 2013 album Asymmetry by Karnivool
- AUM Fidelity, a jazz record label
- Aum (album), by Deuter
- "A.U.M.", a track from the album Bleed the Future (2021) by Archspire

== Education ==
- American University of Madaba, a private university in Jordan
- American University of Malta, a private liberal arts university in Malta
- Auburn University at Montgomery, a public university in Alabama
- American University of Kuwait, Private university in Kuwait.
- American University of the Middle East, Private university in Kuwait.

== Other uses ==
- Animal unit month, in agriculture
- Anxiety/uncertainty management, in psychology
- Assets under management, in finance
- Aum (unit), a UK unit for hock (German white wine)
- Austin Municipal Airport An airport in Austin, Minnesota (IATA: AUM)
- Um (Korean surname), an alternate spelling Aum

== See also ==
- Om (disambiguation)
- Omkara (disambiguation)
- Um (disambiguation)
- Aum Shinrikyo, a Japanese new religious movement, known for carrying out the Tokyo subway sarin attack
