= Envirochemie =

Wastewater treatment facilities manufacturer

Envirochemie GmbH
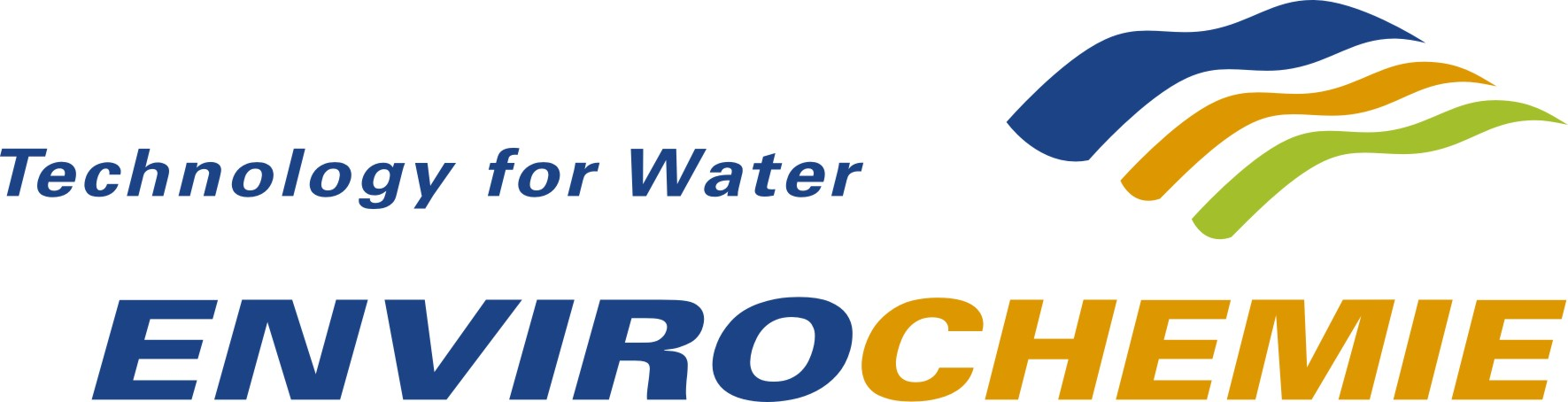
- Company type: Private
- Traded as: ЕС
- Industry: Industrial building
- Founded: 1976
- Headquarters: Roßdorf (Darmstadt), Germany
- Area served: Worldwide
- Key people: Jörg Krause, Stefan Letschert, Volker Oles, Peter Leyendecker
- Products: wastewater treatment systems
- Net income: € 100 million (2017)
- Number of employees: 500 (2018)
- Website: www.envirochemie.com/en/

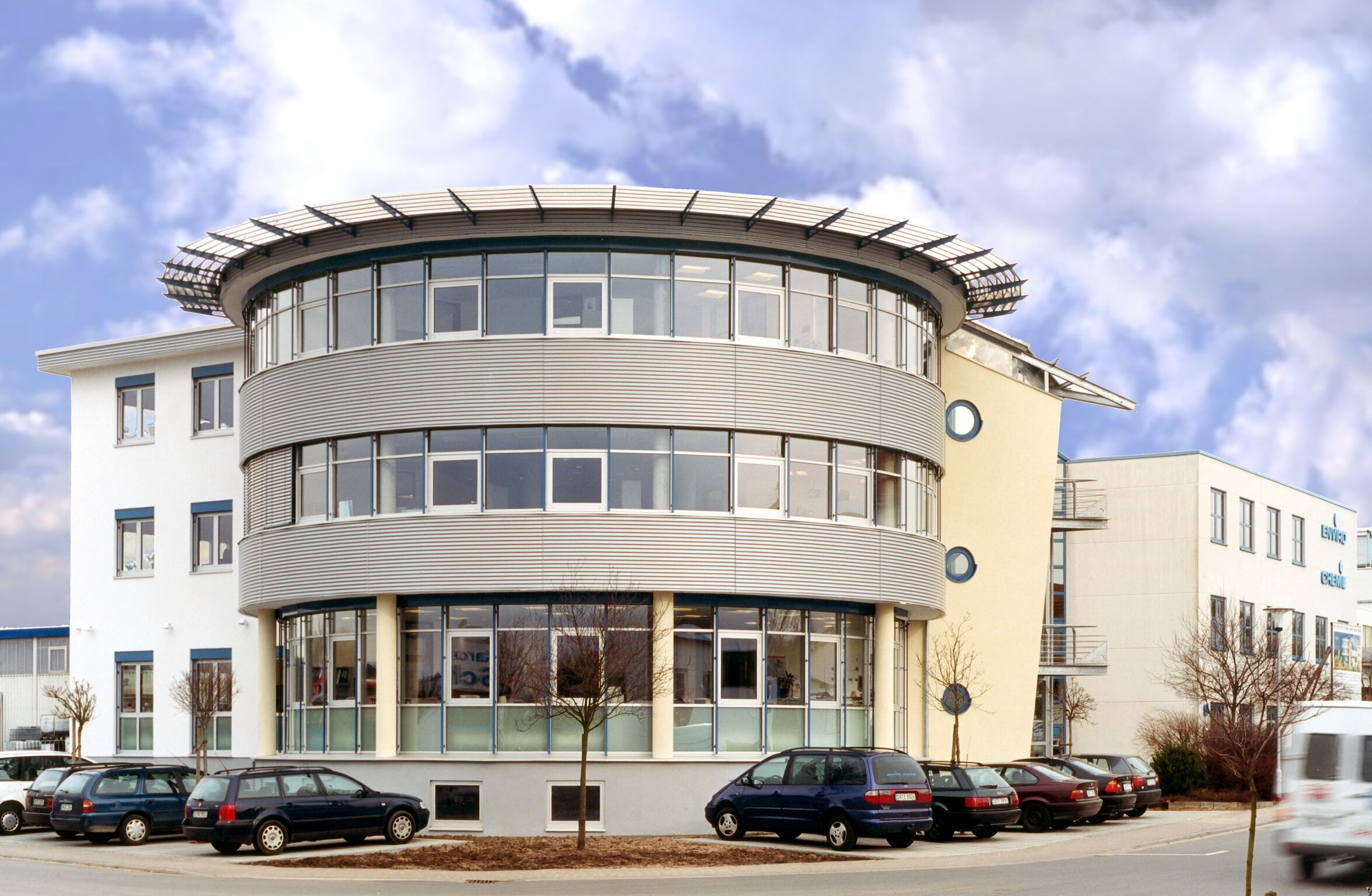
Headquarters of EnviroChemie in Roßdorf, near Darmstadt

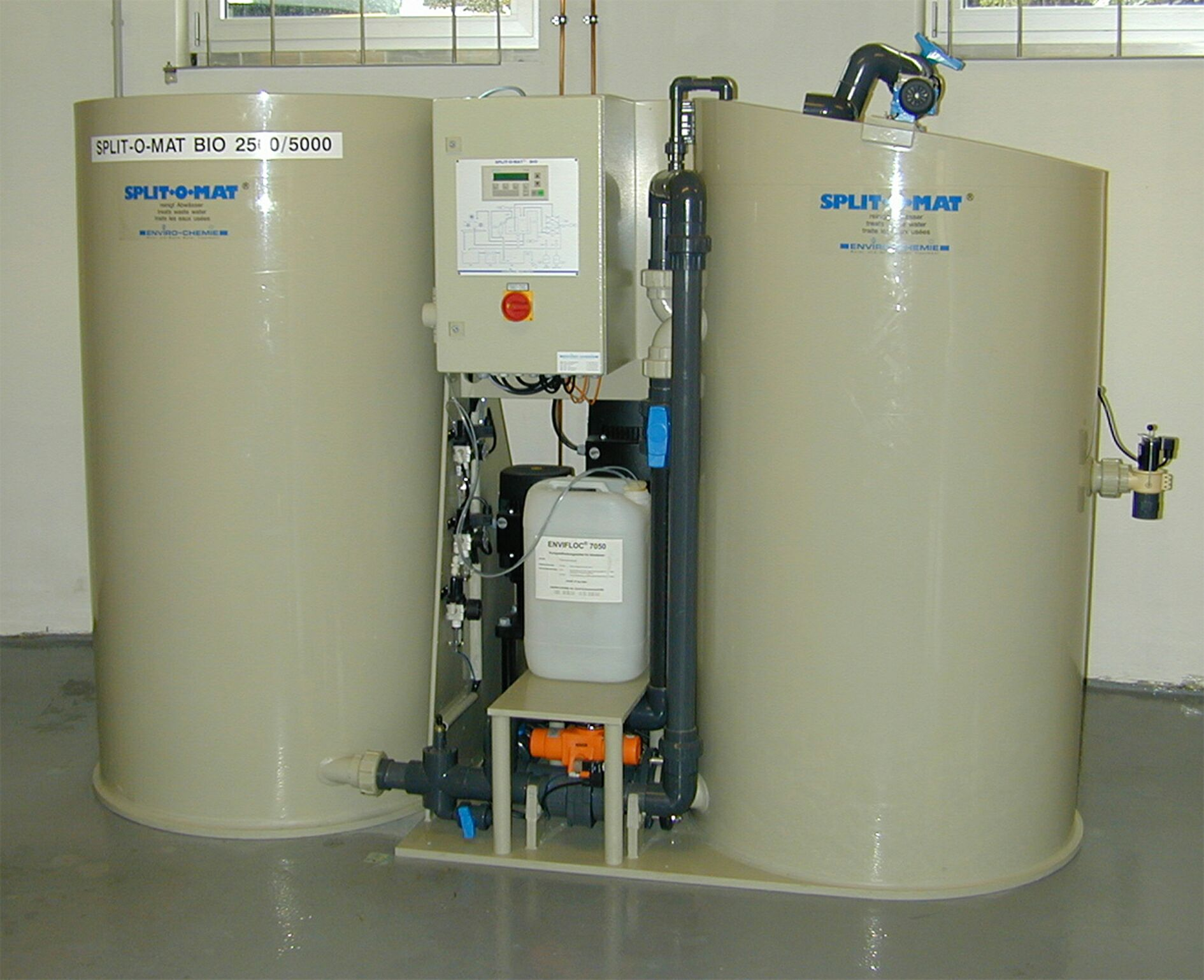
Split-O-Mat compact treatment plant

Envirochemie GmbH is a company that designs and manufactures wastewater treatment facilities. Envirochemie GmbH headquartered in Roßdorf, near Frankfurt/Main, Germany.

== History ==
Envirochemie was founded in 1976 in Switzerland. The company began with the manufacture of compact treatment plants under the trade name Split-O-Mat. A year later, they started to build stationary treatment facilities using physico-chemical treatment. In 1987 the German branch of firm started wastewater treatment using membrane technologies. Since 1996 Envirochemie have applied biological methods in wastewater treatment and have relocated their headquarters to Germany. Since 2000, the company has created subsidiaries in several other countries. Currently, together with subsidiaries in Germany (EnviroFalk GmbH and EnviroDTS GmbH), Austria, Bulgaria, Great Britain, Morocco, the Netherlands, Poland, Russia, Switzerland, and the UAE.

== Activity ==
Envirochemie is engaged in the engineering, construction, modernisation and servicing of industrial water treatment facilities. The company sells treatment facilities, spare parts and reagent for water treatment. Biological and physical-chemical methods, flotation and membrane technology are used. The company also offers compact treatment facilities.

== General sources ==
- Jensen R., Reineke H., Ritter М., Boner К., Lakchardov S., Sphere Neftegaz 2 (2010) (in Russian)
- , Komplett water recycling systems (in German)
- Environmental-experts,
