= Ohms =

ohms (symbol Ω) usually refers to the plural for the unit of electrical resistance, named after Georg Ohm

Ohms or OHMS may also refer to:

- Ohm's law of electric currents, first proposed by Georg Ohm
- O.H.M.S., On His/Her Majesty's Service
- O.H.M.S. (film), a 1937 British action comedy film
- OHMS (1980 film), an American film starring Leslie Nielsen
- Ohms (album), a 2020 album by Deftones
  - "Ohms" (song), a song from the album
- Office of Hazardous Materials Safety, federal safety authority within the United States Department of Transportation
- Oral History Metadata Synchronizer, a web application for accessing oral history interviews

== See also ==
- Ohm (disambiguation)
