= Rebecca Ohm =

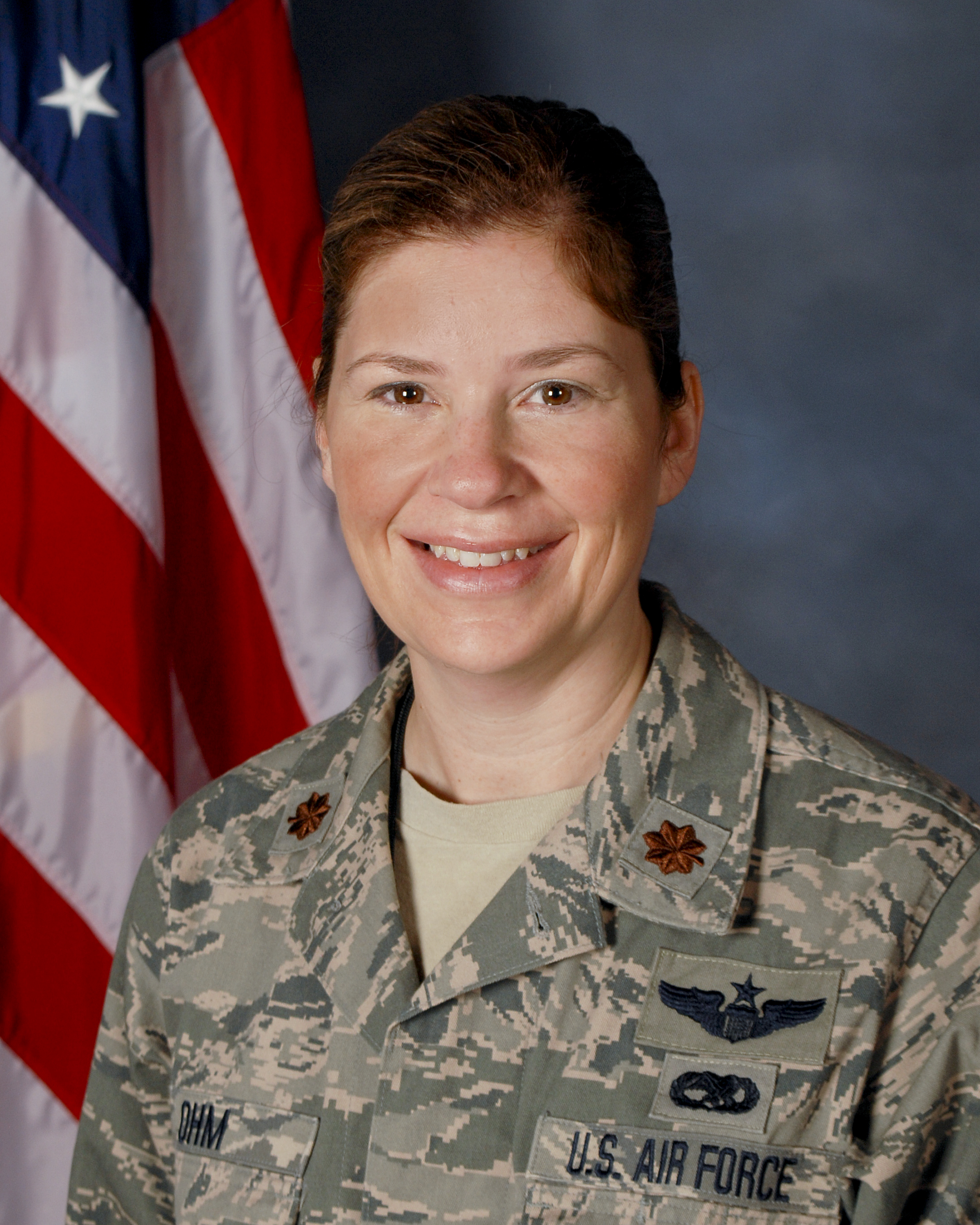
- Military career
- Allegiance: United States
- Branch: United States Air Force
- Unit: Aircraft Maintenance Squadron
- Commands: 180th Fighter Wing
- Conflicts: Operation Northern Watch; Operation Southern Watch; Operation Iraqi Freedom

Rebecca Ohm is a United States Air Force officer and the first female fighter pilot at the 180th Fighter Wing and within the state of Ohio selected to fly a General Dynamics F-16 Fighting Falcon. Her aviator call sign is "Buffy". Ohm is Commander of the 180th Aircraft Maintenance Squadron, 180th Fighter Wing, Toledo Air National Guard Base, Swanton, Ohio.

== Career ==
Ohm began her career at the 180th Fighter Wing in January 1993 where she was assigned to the Aircraft Maintenance Squadron as a flight line crew chief. In 1994, she was selected for a pilot slot at the 180th Fighter Wing, becoming the first female fighter pilot at the 180th Fighter Wing and within the state of Ohio. Ohm has been on several combat deployments and received the Air Medal in support of Operation Northern Watch, Operation Southern Watch, and Operation Iraqi Freedom. Ohm was the first female fighter pilot within the state of Ohio to become an F-16 instructor pilot.

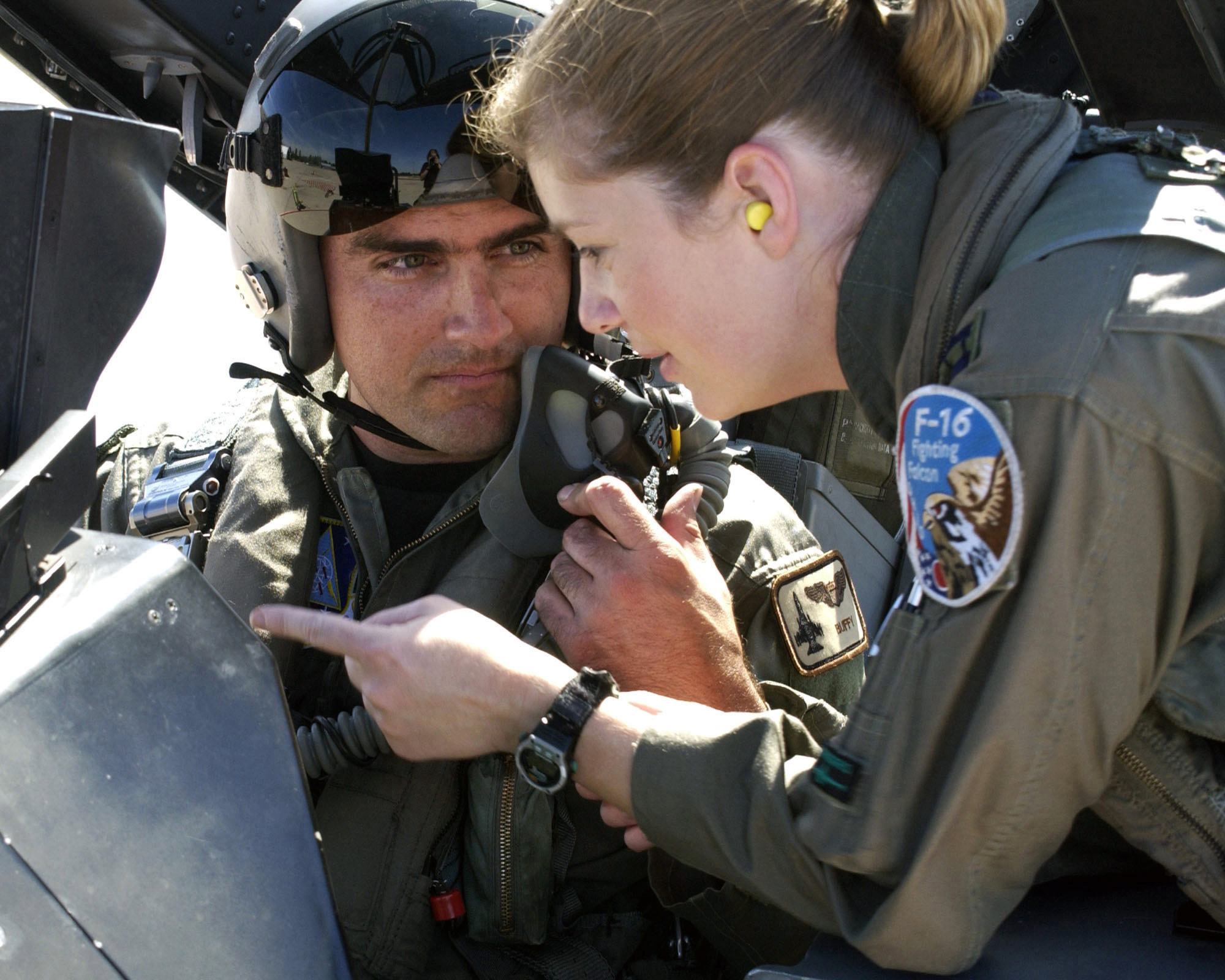
Ohm gives incentive flight briefing to a technical sergeant in September 2004.

She was interviewed in Air Force TV News on 2015 women's history month.
