= OMS =

OMS or Oms may refer to:

== Education ==
- Oakland Middle School, Murfreesboro, Tennessee
- O'Banion Middle School, Garland, Texas
- Odle Middle School, Bellevue, Washington
- List of Old Marlburians, alumni of Marlborough College, Wiltshire, England
- Old Millfieldians, alumni of Millfield School, Somerset, England
- Oakdale Middle School, Ijamsville, Maryland
- Ozaukee Middle School, Fredonia, Wisconsin
- Osceola Middle School, Ocala, Florida

== Medicine ==
- Omohyoid muscle syndrome
- Opsoclonus myoclonus syndrome
- Oral and maxillofacial surgery
- Oral Morphine Solution
- Osteopathic Medical Student, a student Doctor of Osteopathic Medicine

== Organisations ==
- Office of Muqtada al-Sadr (Mahdi Army)
- One Mission Society, a Christian missionary society
- Organisation for the Maintenance of Supplies, a right-wing political group in the UK in the 1920s
- The official name of the World Health Organization (WHO), a specialised agency of the United Nations: French: Organisation mondiale de la santé, Spanish: Organización Mundial de la Salud, Italian: Organizzazione mondiale della sanità, Portuguese: Organização Mundial da Saúde
- International Liaison Department (Comintern) or OMS (Russian acronym)

== Places ==
- IATA code for Omsk Tsentralny Airport
- Oms, Pyrénées-Orientales, a commune in southwestern France

== Science and technology ==
- Office Mobile Service, Microsoft Office Mobile Service (OMS) is the messaging component developed for Outlook 2010 and SharePoint 2010. With OMS, users can integrate the mobile capabilities of Outlook and SharePoint with their mobile devices.
- Oracle Management Server, an executable component of Oracle database servers
- Orbital Maneuvering System, rocket engines used on the Space Shuttle orbiters
- Order management system, business software used in logistics for order entry and processing
- Open Media Commons, an open-source internet group
- Open Metering System, a standardization effort in the field of smart meter
- Open Mobile System, the system used by OPhone
- Open Music System, once widely used MIDI interface software
- Optical Multiplex Section, the optical section layer that multiplexes wavelengths within the Optical Transport Network
- Object Management Server, A technology created and used by Workday, Inc. for storing, accessing and manipulating data.
- Outage management system, used by electricity operators to assist in restoring power
- Object Mirroring System, Vision Solutions OMS is a subset of the VisionSuite product OMS/ODS for replication of IBM Db2 objects in an IBM i environment.
- OMs, an abbreviation for mesylate

== Other ==
- Oms, the humans in the 1973 animated film Fantastic Planet
- Oms, the humans in the novel on which Fantastic Planet was based, Oms en série
- Manuel de Oms y de Santa Pau, apparatchik in the War of Spanish Succession, Viceroy of Peru
- Odorless Mineral Spirits, used in painting and decorating
- Omsætningsafgift, a Danish tax
- One Minute Silence, a metal band
- Member state of the European Union, refers to an (Other) Member State(s)

== See also ==
- OM (disambiguation)
