= Johann Christoph Röhling =

German botanist and clergyman (1757–1813)

Johann Christoph Röhling (27 April 1757 – 19 December 1813) was a German botanist and clergyman who was a native of Gundernhausen, a town near Darmstadt.

He studied theology in Giessen, and later taught school in Frankfurt am Main. In 1792 he became a pastor in Braubach, and in 1800, a parish priest in Breckenheim.

Röhling was the author of "Deutschlands Flora", an important treatise on German flora, of which the first edition was published in 1796. He also published a work on mosses of Germany titled "Deutschlands Moose" (1800). He was the taxonomic authority of the plant genus Melandrium (family Caryophyllaceae). The plant genus Roehlingia (family Dilleniaceae) was named after him by August Wilhelm Dennstedt.
