= Incentive flight =

Program by the United States Air Force

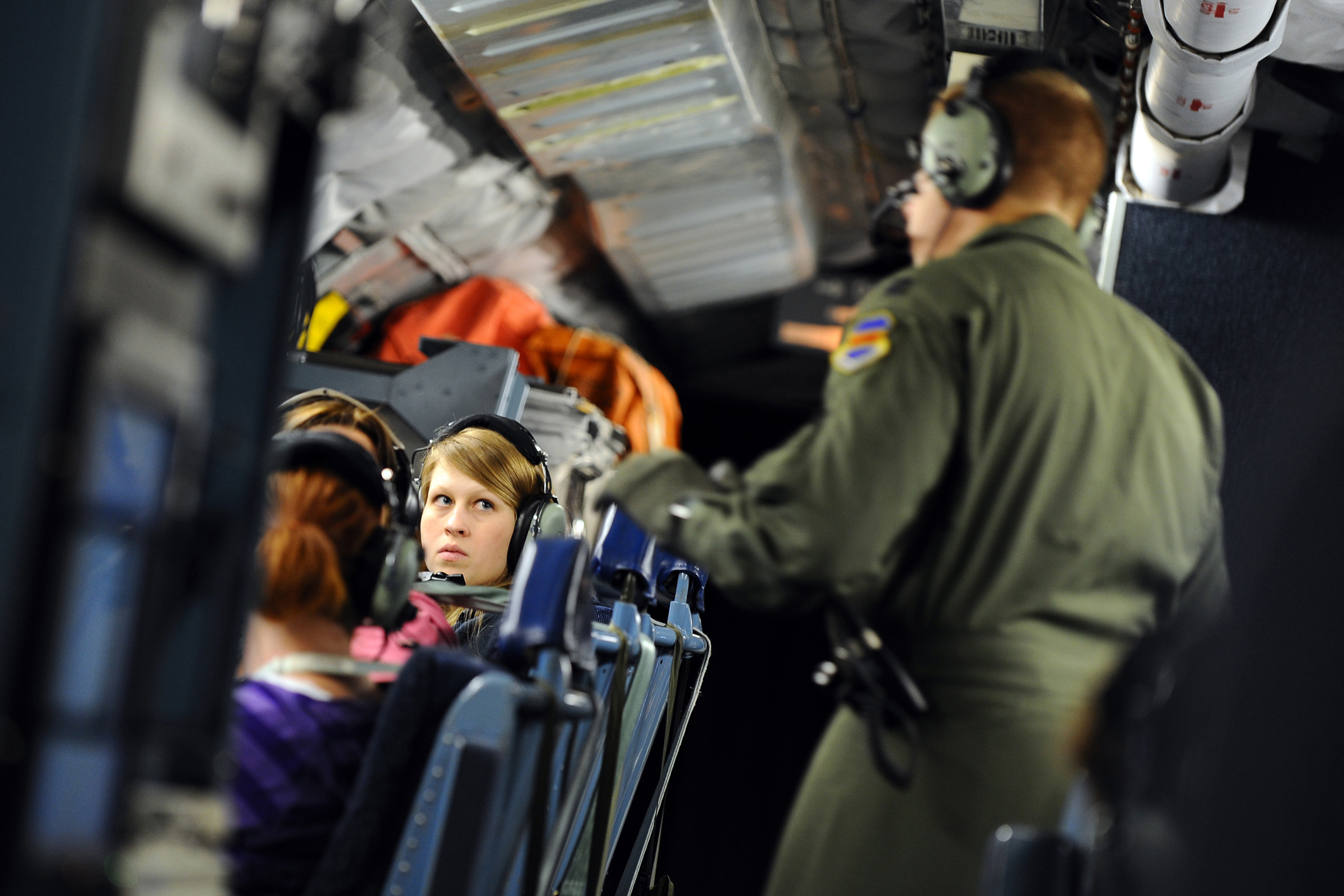
A pre-flight briefing in a surveillance aircraft for an incentive flight

An incentive flight is a form of an incentive program offered by the United States Air Force. Flights are often offered to individuals who show exceptional performance in their duties, and usually last around an hour. For fighter wings, the flight involves flying in the cockpit of the jet, while cargo jets involve rides in the cargo bay.
