= On a Mission =

On a Mission may refer to:

- On a Mission (Buck-O-Nine album), 2001
- On a Mission (Katy B album), 2011
- On a Mission (Trick Pony album), 2002
  - "On a Mission" (Trick Pony song)
- "On a Mission" (Gabriella Cilmi song), 2010
- On a Mission, an album by G-Ism featuring Cool Nutz, 1998
- "On a Mission", a song by Mumzy Stranger, 2010
