= Orbital angular momentum (disambiguation) =

Orbital angular momentum is a concept in classical mechanics.

It may also refer to:

- One of three main quantum angular momentum operators
- Orbital angular momentum of light, a property of electromagnetic waves
- Orbital angular momentum of free electrons, a property of free electrons
- Orbital angular momentum of planets and satellites relative to the object they orbit
