= Aum (unit) =

The aum was an English unit for measuring hock; it was between 30 and 32 gallons.

It is analogous to the Dutch measure of the same name.
