= Organization and Methods (management) =

Management framework

Organization and Methods is a historical term in management science. Divisions of Organization and Methods were charged with devising and managing large scale administrative procedures. The term is notable in that it was the large O & M organizations in areas such as insurance and government which pioneered the commercial use of electronic computers in what became Data Processing, later Information Systems and Information Technology.
