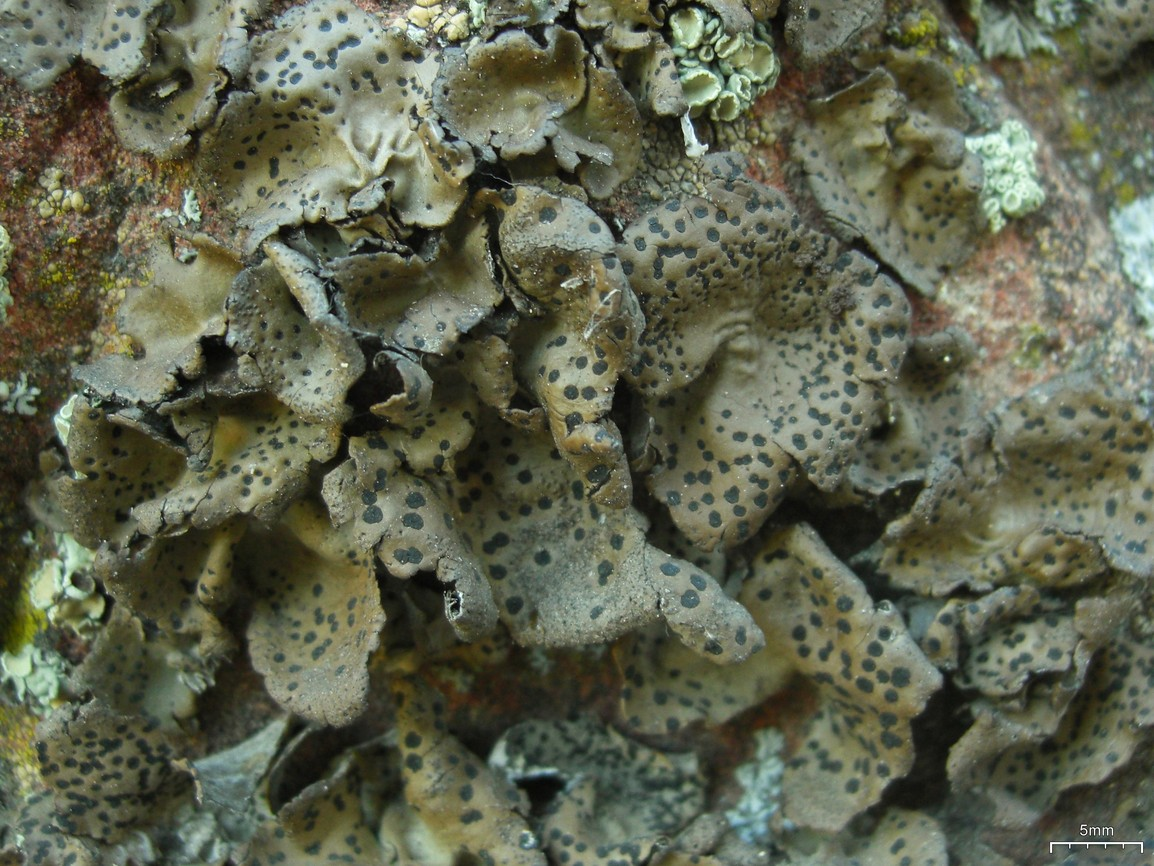

Conservation status
- Apparently Secure (NatureServe)

Scientific classification
- Kingdom: Fungi
- Division: Ascomycota
- Class: Lecanoromycetes
- Order: Umbilicariales
- Family: Umbilicariaceae
- Genus: Umbilicaria
- Species: U. angulata

Binomial name
- Umbilicaria angulata Tuck. (1848)

Synonyms
- Gyrophora vellerea var. angulata (Tuck.) Nyl. (1891); Gyrophora angulata (Tuck.) Herre (1911)

= Umbilicaria angulata =

Species of lichen

Umbilicaria angulata, commonly known as the asterisk rocktripe, is a species of saxicolous (rock-dwelling), foliose lichen in the family Umbilicariaceae. It is found in northwestern North America and east Eurasia, where it grows on acidic rock.

== Taxonomy ==
Umbilicaria angulata was formally described as a new species in 1848 by the American lichenologist Edward Tuckerman. The type specimen was collected from the northwest coastal region of California. In 1891, William Nylander thought the species was more suitably classified as a variety of Gyrophora vellerea. In 1911, Albert Herre proposed that the taxon should be accepted as a full species, but in the genus Gyrophora. This genus has since been subsumed into Umbilicaria.

It is classified in the subgenus Gyrophora of the genus Umbilicaria, according to a 2017 reorganisation of that genus informed by molecular phylogenetics. This subgenus consists of two groups, the monophyletic U. vellea group, and the U. angulata group, which consists of paraphyletic lineages.

"Asterisk rocktripe" is a vernacular name that has been used for this species in North America.

== Description ==
The lichen has an umbilicate thallus, meaning that it is attached to its rock substrate via a single attachment point, and typically reaches up to 5 cm (2 in) in diameter, although specimens up to 9 cm (3.5 in) are known. The thallus is brown to grayish-brown, while the lower surface is dark brown to black, with slender rhizines ranging in frequency from scarce to densely tangled. Although it does not have soredia or isidia, it produces apothecia (fruiting bodies) that are initially level with the thallus surface before becoming sessile. The ascospore made by Umbilicaria angulata are simple (without septa), with typical dimensions of 17–23 by 8–13 μm.

The thallus contains gyrophoric acid as a major secondary metabolite (lichen product), and smaller amounts of lecanoric acid and zeorin.

== Habitat and distribution ==
Umbilicaria angulata is found in northwestern North America, with a range that includes the state of Oregon and the Cascade Range, extending north to costal Alaska. It grows on rock that is not calcareous, instead preferring acidic rock, often amongst scree on outcrops, and on steep rock faces. It also occurs in eastern Eurasia.
