= 2016 Yangon United season =

Yangon United
2016 season
- Owner: (Myanmar) Tay Za
- Chairman: Pyae Phyo Tayza
- Manager: (Myanmar) Myo Min Tun
- Stadium: Yangon United Sports Complex

== Season Review ==
Period	Sportswear	Sponsor
2016	(Thailand) Grand Sport	(Myanmar) Asia Green Development Bank

== Transfers ==
In: Note: Flags indicate national team as defined under FIFA eligibility rules; some limited exceptions apply. Players may hold more than one non-FIFA nationality.

No.	Pos.	Nation	Player
—	MF	MYA	Kyaw Min Oo (from (Myanmar) Ayeyawady United)
—	FW	MYA	Adilson (from (Brazil) XV de Piracicaba)
—	FW	BRA	Marcelo Fenandes (from (Brazil) A.D. Cabofriense)
—	DF	MYA	Thein Zaw (from (Myanmar) Zwegabin United)

Out: Note: Flags indicate national team as defined under FIFA eligibility rules; some limited exceptions apply. Players may hold more than one non-FIFA nationality.

No.	Pos.	Nation	Player
13	FW	BRA	Cézar (contract end)
20	FW	BRA	Emerson (contract end)
11	MF	MYA	Aung Moe (to Zwegabin United)
5	DF	MYA	Latt Ko Ko Aye (to Zwegabin United)
14	DF	MYA	Zaw Win (to Zwegabin United)

== Squad ==
Note: Flags indicate national team as defined under FIFA eligibility rules; some limited exceptions apply. Players may hold more than one non-FIFA nationality.

No.	Pos.	Nation	Player
1	GK	BRA	Luiz Fernando
2	DF	MYA	Zarni Htet
3	DF	MYA	Zaw Min Tun
4	DF	MYA	David Htan
5	DF	JPN	Kunihiro Yamashita
6	MF	MYA	Kyaw Min Oo
7	FW	MYA	Kyaw Ko Ko
8	FW	BRA	Marcelo Fenandes
9	FW	MYA	Than Paing
10	MF	MYA	Kyi Lin
11	MF	MYA	Kaung Sat Naing
13	DF	MYA	Thein Zaw
14	FW	MYA	Aung Kyaw Htwe
15	MF	MYA	Swan Htet Aung
16	DF	MYA	Nan Wai Min
17	DF	MYA	Khin Maung Lwin (Captain)
18	FW	MYA	Than Htet Aung
19	MF	MYA	Yan Lin Aung

No.	Pos.	Nation	Player
20	FW	BRA	Adilson
21	MF	MYA	Zon Moe Aung
22	GK	MYA	Aung Wai Phyo
23	DF	MYA	Pyae Phyo Aung
24	MF	MYA	Kyaw Htoo
25	MF	MYA	Yan Aung Kyaw
26	MF	MYA	Thiha Zaw
27	DF	MYA	Thiha Htet Aung
28	MF	MYA	Min Kyaw Khant
30	GK	MYA	Nay Hlaing
33	GK	MYA	Wai Lin Aung
—	MF	MYA	Nyein Chan Aung

== Coaching staff ==
Position	Staff
Manager	(North Macedonia) Marjan Sekulovski
Assistant Manager	(Myanmar) Myo Min Tun
Assistant Manager	(Myanmar) U Than Wai
Assistant Manager	(Myanmar) U Tin Maung Tun
Goalkeeper Coach	(Myanmar) U Win Naing
Fitness Coach	(Myanmar) U Zaw Naing

=== Other information ===
Owner	(Myanmar) Tay Za
Chairman	(Myanmar) Pyae Phyo Tayza
Ground (capacity and dimensions)	Yangon United Sports Complex (3,500 / 103x67 metres)
Training Ground	Yangon United Sports Complex
