= Htoo =

Htoo may refer to

- Htoo (name)
- Htoo Foundation in Myanmar
- Htoo Group of Companies in Myanmar
