= Htoo Foundation =

Charitable foundation in Myanmar

HTOO Foundation
- Founded: 2008
- Founder: Tay Za
- Purpose: Education, Healthcare, Culture
- Location: Yangon, Myanmar (Burma)
- Region served: Myanmar
- Method: Donations and Grants
- Key people: Tay Za, founder and chairperson
- Endowment: K 9.5 billion as of 2014
- Website: www.htoofoundation.org

Htoo Foundation is a foundation in Myanmar (Burma) founded by Burmese business tycoon Tay Za.

== History ==
Htoo Foundation is founded on 5 May 2008 after cyclone Nargis, the tropical cyclone that caused the worst natural disaster in Myanmar. The stated objectives of the foundation are "enhancing the living standards of national races living in remote areas, preservation of culture, tradition and dialect of national races living in remote area, to offer emergency relief assistance in areas affected by natural hazard within Myanmar, Preservation and reforestation of natural forests of Myanmar and preservation and protection of exotic wildfire species in their natural habitat."

== Financials ==
Founding background source coming from the Htoo Group of Companies. The main key strongly supporter for Htoo Foundation is Air Bagan, Asia Green Development Bank, Aureum Palace Hotels & Resorts, Myanmar Treasure Hotels & Resorts. The foundation chairperson Tay Za began his career in the 1980s and started Htoo Group in the early 1990s to extract timber from Burma's forests.

== Activities ==
Htoo Foundation is participating in humanitarian work such as providing help in the promotion of for major sectors to develop for future of Myanmar. The four sectors are Education, Culture, Health care and Regional development in remote areas of the country.

=== Health Sector ===
Htoo Foundation has built a hospital, a dispensary and provided medical assistance and to villages across Putao, Kachin State. Htoo Foundation also provided medical equipments to Bogalay Hospital in Ayeyarwady Region.

=== Education ===
Htoo Foundation established vocational schools in remote areas at Kachin State and Chin State, donated schools and accessories in Mon State, Chin State and Ayeyarwady Region. The foundation started scholarship program in Political Science, Law and Arbitration subjects at abroad. Another scholarship programme is to attend the Pilot training courses by Myanmar Aviation Academy.

=== Peace Process ===
Foundation was also assisted in peace process by donating rice bags, tube wells, and cash to IDP camps of Kachin State.

=== Preservation and Protection ===
Htoo Foundation provide with financial assistance and skilled technicians for curbing environmental damage and reforestation in Mandalay Region, Kachin State and Shan State. The foundation established a butterfly museum and petrified wood museum.

== Controversy ==
The foundation's parent Htoo Group of Companies has been involved in massive timber extraction projects and continuously seeking extensive logging contracts from Myanmar government. According to The Irrawaddy, in Kachin State alone, Tay Za has been granted a 100,000-acre (40,000 hectare) logging concession by the government that would allow him to cut down vast swathes of valuable, pristine teak forest. In 2006–2007, Htoo Trading, a division of Htoo Holdings involved in teak log exports, was Burma's top private exporter and fifth largest overall, with gross revenues of $65.1 million.

In 2014, the Foundation won the 2014 National Best Social Welfare Team award though its parent company pays substantially low taxes.
