= Pye Phyo Tayza =

Burmese businessman

- ပြည့်ဖြိုးတေဇ
- Born: 29 January 1987 (age 39); Yangon, Myanmar
- Occupations: Managing director, Htoo Group of Companies
- Spouse: Thet Hnin Hlaing
- Parent(s): Tay Za (father); Thida Zaw (mother)
- Relatives: Htoo Htet Tayza (younger brother); Rachel Tayza (younger sister)

Pye Phyo Tayza (Burmese: ပြည့်ဖြိုးတေဇ; born 29 January 1987) is a Burmese business tycoon and the managing director of the Htoo Group of Companies, a major crony conglomerate in Myanmar. He is the current president of Yangon United F.C. and vice president of Myanmar Football Federation, the governing body of football in Myanmar. Pye Phyo Tayza is the eldest son and heir of Tay Za, Myanmar's richest man.

== Early life and education ==
Pye Phyo Tayza was born on 29 January 1987 in Yangon to Tay Za and Thida Zaw, the eldest of three children. He attended United World College of South East Asia.

== Business interests ==
At the age of 16, he was blacklisted by the EU for the first time in 2003, and his listing was renewed in 2008. In 2007, following protests against the junta on the streets of many cities in Burma, the United States government imposed sanctions against him, and his father Tay Za.

He is a director and shareholder of numerous subsidiaries and associated companies under the Htoo Group of Companies umbrella. He is the managing director of Apex Petroleum Company Limited and Apex Gourmet, a food and beverage importer and distributor, including wine from the EU and the U.S. He also part-owned Glory International Trading Company Limited, United Walk Company Limited, and Yangon Aircraft Engineering Company Limited (YAECO), which provides services to the Air Force, including the conversion of planes.

On 19 May 2010, Pye Phyo Tayza, lost a legal battle to overturn European Union sanctions against him at the Council of the European Union. In March 2012, the European Court of Justice ruled that Pye Phyo Tayza be allowed to regain access to his accounts in Europe, as he had testified that he was not connected to his father's business interests.

On 31 January 2022, on the eve of the 1st anniversary of the 2021 Myanmar coup d'état, the U.S. Department of the Treasury added him to its Specially Designated Nationals (SDN) list for providing financial support to Myanmar's military regime due to his association with the Htoo Group of Companies.

== Sport posts ==
He became the president of Yangon United F.C. in 2009 at the age of 24. In 2020, he was elected vice president of Myanmar Football Federation, making him the world's youngest FIFA team president.

== Charity work ==
He donated 10 million Kyats to the Ayeyarwady Centre for combatting COVID-19 pandemic across the country. He donated 150 million kyats to Junta Chief Min Aung Hlaing's Maravijaya Buddha in 2023.

== Personal life ==
He married Thet Hnin Hlaing, the daughter of Tun Hlaing, director of the Myanmar Directorate of Defence Industries, in 2020. The wedding was held in a resort town near Mandalay and was the biggest wedding in Myanmar.
