= Myanmar Petroleum Trade Association =

Business advocacy organization

- မြန်မာနိုင်ငံ စက်သုံးဆီ တင်သွင်းရောင်းချ ဖြန့်ဖြူးရေးအသင်း
- Type: advocacy group
- Purpose: Business and Industry advocacy
- Location: Yangon
- Region served: Myanmar
- Method: Media attention, direct-appeal campaigns Political lobbying
- Key people: Tay Za (President)
- Website: mpta.org.mm/index.php

The Myanmar Petroleum Trade Association (Burmese: မြန်မာနိုင်ငံ စက်သုံးဆီ တင်သွင်းရောင်းချ ဖြန့်ဖြူးရေးအသင်း), also called MPTA, is a national level organization that oversee and monopolise private petroleum distribution market in Myanmar. The MPTA is run by the local companies that dominate the market. In 2017, the MPTA criticize the government's decision to open the fuel market to foreign investors.

Myanmar Petroleum Trade Association was founded in 2010. As of 2017, there are 400 members in MPTA.
