= Kandawgyi Palace Hotel =

- The Kandawgyi Boat Club, circa 1934
- Interactive map of the Kandawgyi Palace Hotel area

General information
- Type: Hotel
- Architectural style: Traditional Southeast Asian palace
- Location: Kan Yeiktha Road and Kandawgyi Lake, Yangon
- Coordinates: 16°47′41″N 96°09′43″E
- Construction started: 1934
- Completed: 1993
- Destroyed: 19 October 2017
- Owner: Tay Za
- Management: Htoo Group of Companies

Design and construction
- Developer: Baiyoke Group of Hotels

The Kandawgyi Palace Hotel was a five-star hotel and historical landmark overlooking Kandawgyi Lake in Yangon, Myanmar. The hotel was destroyed by a fire on the morning of 19 October 2017.

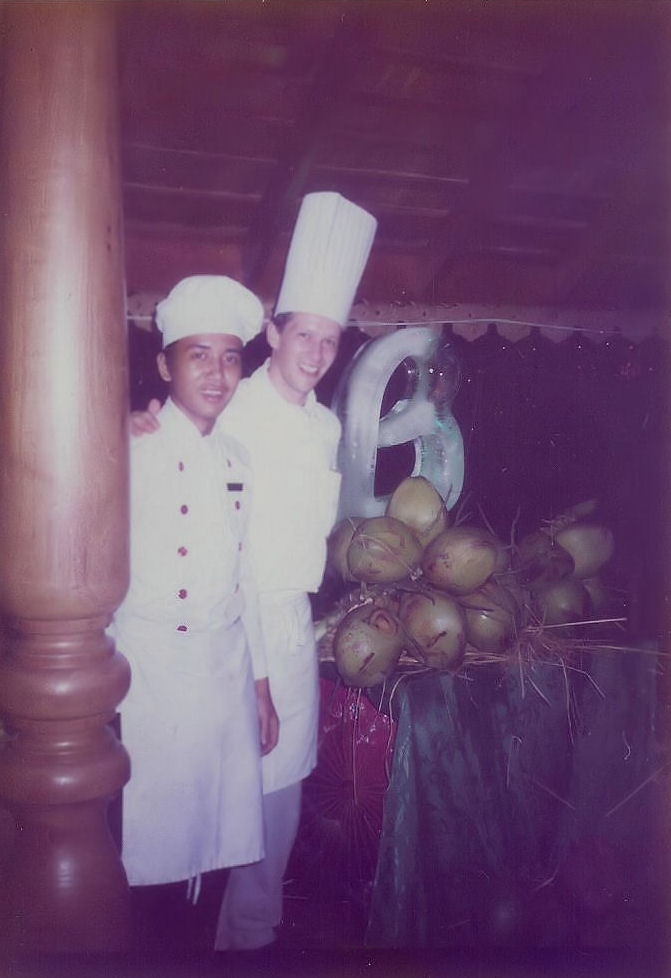
Executive Sous Chef Andreas Voght and Chef De Partie Ye Myat Tun during the Palace Hotel's Grand Re-Opening in 1993

== History ==
The Kandawgyi Palace Hotel was originally constructed in 1934 as the Rangoon Rowing Club, a two-story red-brick building serving as a retreat for British officers during the colonial era. Membership was predominantly restricted to foreigners and their guests.

During World War II, the Japanese occupation forces repurposed the building as a welfare department. Following Burma's independence in 1948, the site was transformed into the National Biological Museum, showcasing the country's diverse flora and fauna. A dinosaur sculpture from this period remained in the hotel's gardens overlooking the pool area.

In 1979, the Ministry of Hotels and Tourism assumed control of the property, initiating its operation as a hotel featuring ten teak bungalows. A significant redevelopment occurred in 1993, replacing the bungalows with a larger structure designed to emulate a traditional Southeast Asian palace.

In 2010, the hotel was acquired by the Htoo Group of Companies, founded by Tay Za, a Burmese businessman known for his close ties to the former military regime.

== 2017 Fire ==
In the early hours of 19 October 2017, a fire broke out at approximately 3:20 a.m. The blaze is believed to have originated from an electrical malfunction, which subsequently ignited gas canisters stored in the hotel's boiler room. The fire rapidly engulfed the teak structure, leading to its complete destruction.

Emergency response involved the deployment of 80 fire trucks and numerous firefighters who battled the flames for several hours. At the time of the incident, the hotel had 96 occupied rooms with a total of 141 guests. Two fatalities were reported: a Japanese national identified as Masafumi Tomita and a female victim. A firefighter was treated for smoke inhalation, and another guest sustained injuries after jumping from an upper floor.
