= Asian Wings Airways =

Myanmar domestic airline

IATA	ICAO	Call sign
YJ	AWM	ASIAN STAR
- Founded: 2011; 15 years ago
- Commenced operations: January 27, 2011; 15 years ago
- Ceased operations: January 1, 2019; 7 years ago
- Operating bases: Yangon International Airport
- Fleet size: 4
- Destinations: 12
- Parent company: Asian Wings Airways, Limited
- Headquarters: Yangon, Myanmar
- Key people: Lwin Moe (ED)
- Website: www.asianwingsair.com (Not Functional)

Asian Wings Airways was an airline based in Myanmar. It began service on 27 January 2011 with codeshare agreements with Air Bagan. It offered regular flights to all major tourist destinations in Myanmar.

Asian Wings Airways was owned and operated by Sun Far Travels and Tours Company, Limited.

All Nippon Airways announced in 2013 that it would purchase a 49% stake in Asian Wings Airways for around 3 billion Japanese yen, the first foreign investment in a Myanmar-based airline since democratization, but in 2014 ANA declared that its board of directors had agreed to cancel the investment, citing “intensified” competition in the aviation sector.

The airline suspended all operations on January 1, 2019.

== Destinations ==
As of June 2016 the airline served the following destinations within Myanmar:

- Bhamo - Bhamo Airport
- Heho - Heho Airport
- Homalin - Homalin Airport
- Kalay - Kalaymyo Airport
- Kyaingtong - Kyaingtong Airport
- Kyaukpyu - Kyaukpyu Airport
- Lashio - Lashio Airport
- Mandalay - Mandalay International Airport, hub
- Monywa - Monywa Airport
- Myitkyina - Myitkyina Airport
- Tachilek - Tachilek Airport
- Yangon - Yangon International Airport, main hub

== Fleet ==
=== Current fleet ===
Prior to suspending operations, the Asian Wings Airways fleet consisted of the following aircraft:

Asian Wings Airways fleet
Aircraft	In fleet	Orders	Notes
ATR 72-500	4	0	
Total	4	0	

=== Former fleet ===
- 2 further ATR 72-500 (2013–2016)
- 1 Airbus A321 (2012–2016)

== See also ==
- List of airlines of Burma
