= Bogyoke Aung San Park =

Park in Yangon, Myanmar

- Bogyoke Park
- ဗိုလ်ချုပ်အောင်ဆန်းပန်းခြံ
- Bogyoke Aung San Park in 1895
- Interactive map of Bogyoke Aung San Park
- Type: Public urban park
- Location: Natmauk Street, Bahan Township, Yangon, Yangon Region, Myanmar
- Coordinates: 16.7960192°N 96.1418437°E
- Area: 1.3 acres (0.53 ha)
- Opened: c. 1850s
- Manager: Yangon City Development Committee
- Open: 8:00 AM – 10:00 PM daily
- Status: Open to public

Bogyoke Aung San Park (Burmese: ဗိုလ်ချုပ်အောင်ဆန်းပန်းခြံ), also known as Bogyoke Park, is a public park in Yangon, Myanmar. Located on the northern shore of Kandawgyi Lake, the park is situated near the Shwedagon Pagoda and Maha Wizaya Pagoda, and west of the Yangon Zoological Gardens. It is named after Aung San, a Burmese independence leader.

== History ==
The park was formerly known as Dalhousie Park Memorial Garden during the British colonial period, named after the Marquis of Dalhousie. Plans for the park were made in 1854, and construction began a few years later. The park later contained a statue of King Edward VII.

In the 1930s, the park was renamed Aung Zeya Park, after Alaungpaya, the founder of the Konbaung dynasty. After Japanese forces occupied Rangoon in 1942, the statue of King Edward VII was removed and replaced with a monument containing "victory earth" brought from Shwebo, the former capital of Alaungpaya.

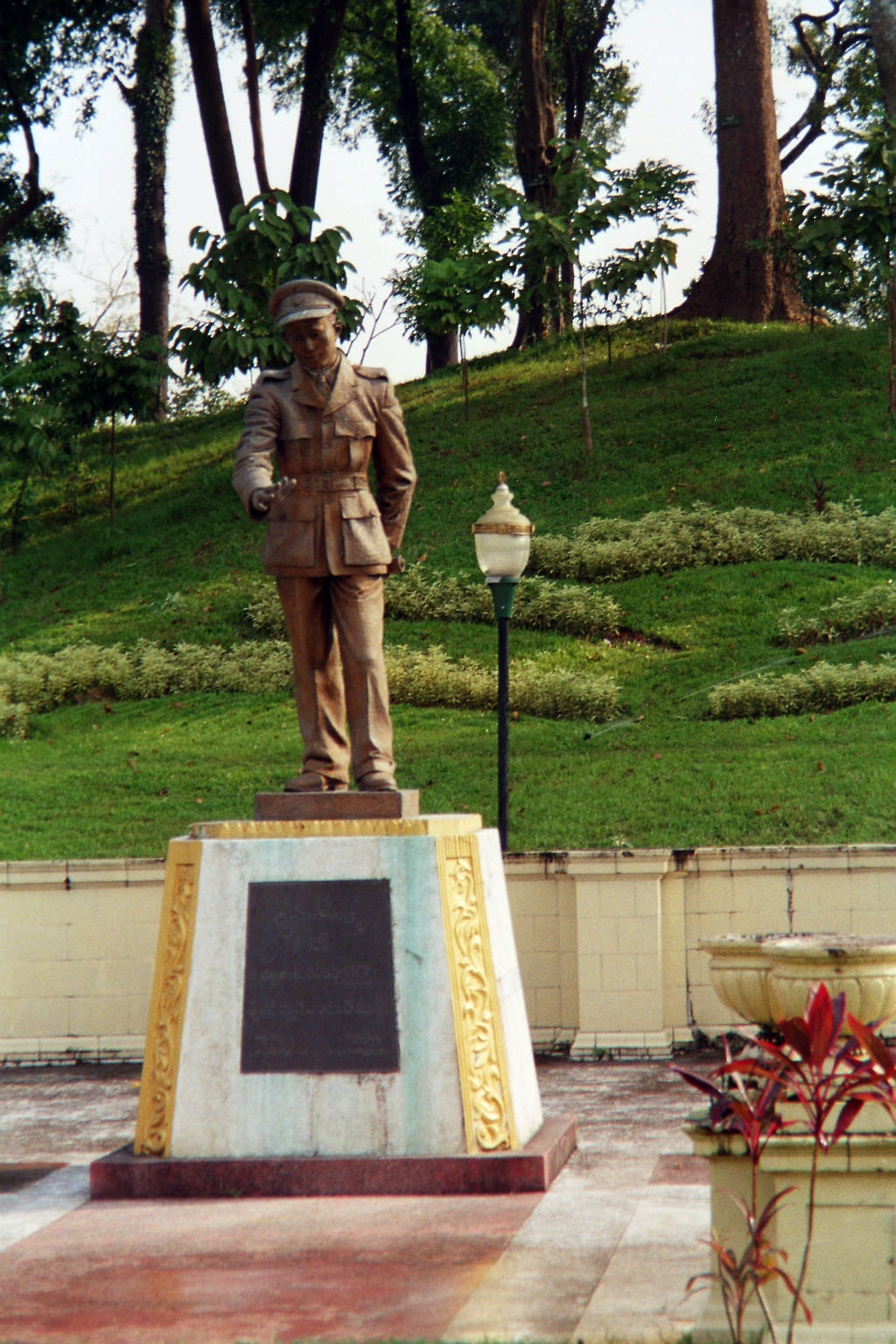
Bronze statue of Bogyoke Aung San at the park

After independence, the park was renamed after Aung San, and the previous monument was replaced with a bronze statue of him. The statue was unveiled on 13 February 1955, on Aung San's 40th birthday. Standing 8 feet 4 inches (2.54 m) tall, it was created by English sculptor Bainbridge Copnell in collaboration with Myanmar artist San Pe. The inscriptions on the pedestal were suggested by poets Zawgyi and Min Thu Wun, former Prime Minister U Nu, United Nations Secretary-General U Thant, and Colonel Ba Shin.

The park was upgraded in July 2020, in commemoration of the 73rd anniversary of Martyrs' Day.
