= Air Bagan Flight 011 =

2012 aviation accident in Myanmar

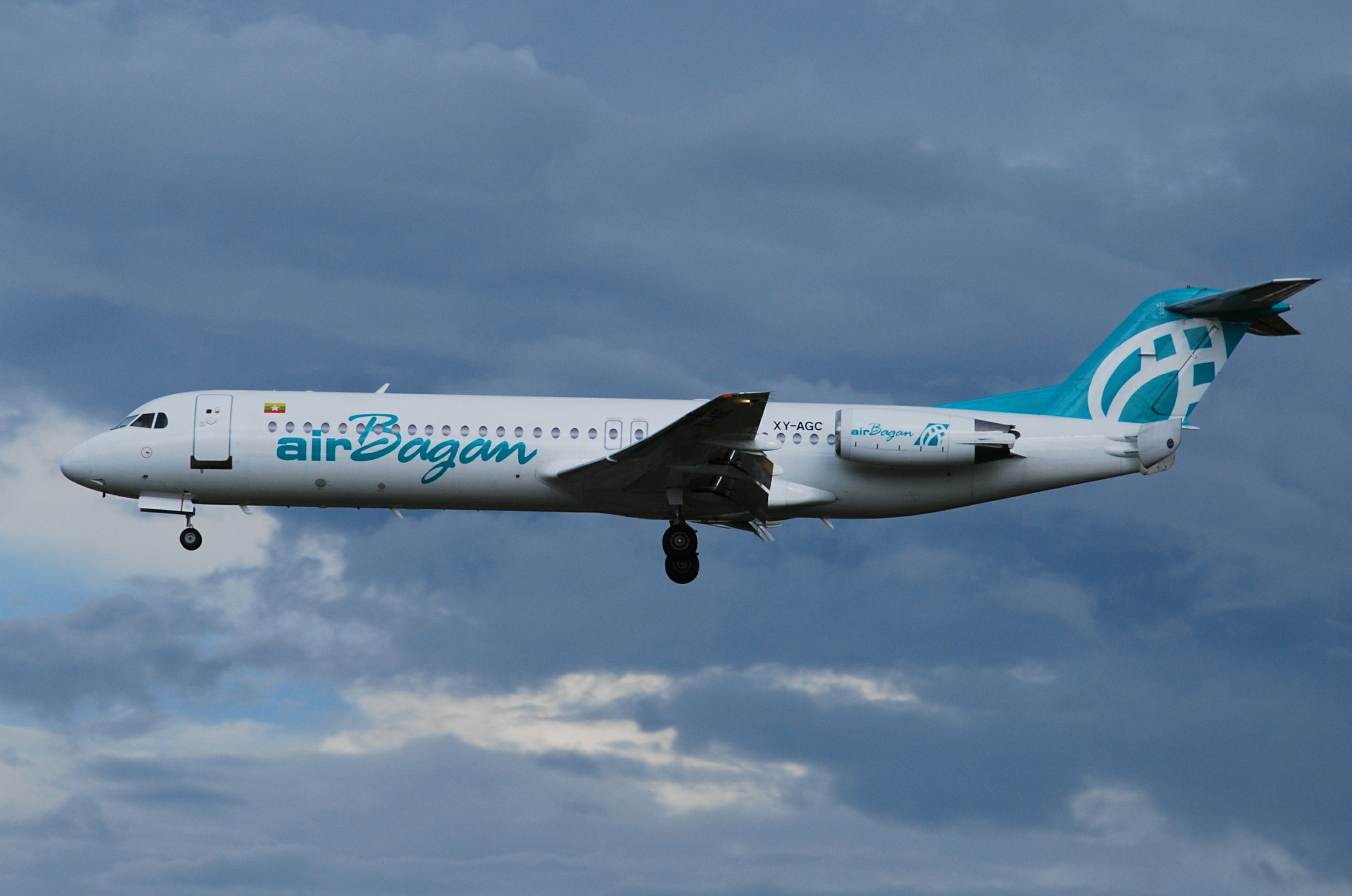
- XY-AGC, the aircraft involved in the accident, photographed in 2011

Accident
- Date: 25 December 2012
- Summary: Controlled flight into terrain due to pilot error
- Site: Heho Airport, Heho, Myanmar; 20°43′30″N 096°47′31″E
- Total fatalities: 2
- Total injuries: 10

Aircraft
- Aircraft type: Fokker 100
- Operator: Air Bagan
- IATA flight No.: W9011
- ICAO flight No.: JAB011
- Call sign: AIR BAGAN 011
- Registration: XY-AGC
- Flight origin: Yangon International Airport
- Stopover: Mandalay International Airport
- Destination: Heho Airport
- Occupants: 71
- Passengers: 65
- Crew: 6
- Fatalities: 1
- Injuries: 9
- Survivors: 70

Ground casualties
- Ground fatalities: 1
- Ground injuries: 1

Air Bagan Flight 011 was a scheduled domestic passenger flight of a Fokker 100 twinjet from Yangon to Heho, Myanmar. On 25 December 2012, the aircraft crash-landed short of the runway at Heho Airport in fog, coming to a stop in a paddy field and bursting into flames. One of the 71 people on board and a motorcyclist on the ground were killed and more than 10 people were injured.

The Myanmar Accident Investigation Bureau (MAIB) concluded that the pilots had not followed the proper procedure for an approach to Heho. During their landing attempt, the crew decided to continue their descent below the minimum decision altitude (MDA) even though they had not obtained visual contact with the runway. The pilots' high workload and the decision to assign the First Officer as pilot flying (PF) without sufficient judgement further contributed to the crash.

== Aircraft ==
The aircraft was a 21-year-old Fokker 100, manufactured in 1991 as PH-CFE. The aircraft was delivered to Air Bagan from British Midland Airways in 2005. The aircraft had accrued a total flight cycles of 32,584 cycles.

Despite its old age, the aircraft had passed the latest major maintenance check in November. The last line check had been conducted just two days before the accident flight.

== Passengers and crew ==
There were 65 passengers and 6 crew members on board the aircraft. The majority of the passengers were foreigners, but the exact number was not known. According to reports, the passengers included nationals from Australia, France, Germany, South Korea, Switzerland, Taiwan, the United Kingdom, and the United States. The rest were Burmese.

The identities of the captain and the first officer were not revealed by authorities. However, according to the investigation report, the captain was an experienced 49-year-old pilot who had 5,937 total flight hours, had been a Fokker 100 captain for 6 years, and had 2,547 hours in the Fokker 100. The first officer had only accrued 849 total flight hours, of which 486 were in the type.

== Accident ==
Flight 011 was a flight from Myanmar's largest city of Yangon to Heho with a stopover in Mandalay. The route was popular among tourists as Heho was the main gateway to Inle Lake, a major tourist attraction in the country. The Fokker 100 had departed Yangon International Airport in the morning on its first leg to Mandalay International Airport. In Mandalay, a total of 60 passengers disembarked and 40 passengers boarded the aircraft. With a total of 71 people on board, the aircraft departed Mandalay at 08:26 local time to Heho. The first officer was designated as the pilot flying for the leg while the captain was assigned for the radio communication.

On approaching Heho, air traffic control reported local weather conditions to the crew as wind calm, visibility 3000 m and "distinct fog." As it was foggy, the crew decided to conduct a non-precision approach. At about 08:47 local time, the crew initiated a non-precision NDB approach procedure to Heho's runway 36. Approximately 10 nautical miles from the airport, the crew reported that they had obtained visual contact with the runway. The aircraft was then configured for a landing at Heho.

As the aircraft was aligned with runway 36, the crew decided to descend further. However, the aircraft later entered some clouds and the crew eventually lost visual contact with the runway. The captain exclaimed "Not okay" and instructed the first officer to push the altitude hold button so that the autopilot would maintain the aircraft's altitude. The captain then pushed the altitude knob and tried to disconnect the autopilot. At the same time, the EGPWS warned the crew of the decreasing altitude.

At 08:53 local time, about 1.3 km (0.7 nmi) from the runway threshold, the aircraft struck power lines and trees. During the impact with the trees, the left wing separated, rupturing the fuel lines. The debris and the aircraft's fuel then struck a passing motorcycle that was carrying two people. The aircraft eventually struck telephone cables and fences before colliding with terrain across a road. It then immediately burst into flames. The first officer then declared "Mayday" and an emergency evacuation was carried out. Of the 8 emergency exits, two were not used as both were located over the right wing, which was on fire.

Heho firefighting services eventually arrived at the crash site within 10 minutes, though with some difficulties due to the location of the crash. At least nine local firefighting vehicles were deployed to assist with the rescue effort. Local police and citizens also participated in the evacuation of the aircraft's occupants. Ten people were seriously injured by the crash, consisting of two crews, seven passengers, and one person on the ground. Of those, eight were transported to Yangon and two others were transported to Bangkok for further treatment. Other injured occupants were transported to Shan State's capital of Taunggyi for examination. A total of 61 people were listed as mildly injured or unhurt. Two people were killed by the crash, a passenger and one of the occupants of the passing motorcycle.

== Response ==
In response to the crash, survivors of foreign nationalities were provided with accommodation in Yangon's Kandawgyi Palace Hotel, US$2,000, and 300,000 kyat for buying clothes and other essentials. Air Bagan stated that they would pay for the accommodation and medical bills. The owner of the airline, Htoo Foundation, donated US$5,000 to the families of the deceased. The airline initially had offered "reasonable compensation" to the survivors; however, subsequent problems with the payment eventually caused survivors to file lawsuits. The parties later agreed to a substantial settlement. Survivors of Burmese origins, however, reported that they had only received a little compensation from Air Bagan.

== Investigation ==
On 26 December, Burmese authorities formed the Myanmar Accident Investigation Bureau. The team was headed by the Deputy Director General of the department, U Win Swe Tun, and consisted of four other members. On the same day, investigators managed to retrieve the aircraft's flight recorders from the wreckage. The team initially had planned to send the flight recorders to Singapore for analysis, however it was deemed impossible due to the poor condition of both recorders. The flight recorders were later sent to Australian Transport Safety Bureau for analysis.

Initial statements by the authorities suggested that the pilots mistook a road for the airport's runway in low visibility. Managing director of Air Bagan U Thet Htoo Htwe stated that the aircraft was airworthy and that both pilots had followed the standard operating procedures.

=== Cause of crash ===
During the approach to Heho, the crew elected to conduct a non-directional beacon (NDB) approach. As it was an NDB approach, the crew were required to pass the Heho NDB first and then turn right to a heading of 220. The crew later had to turn left to heading 010 to align with the runway. The flight recorder, however, showed that the crew turned prior to Heho's NDB and later had to correct their heading again to compensate for the premature turn.

Flight 011 later entered clouds, obstructing their previously established visual contact with the runway. The standard operating procedures from Air Bagan stated that a flight officer was not allowed to conduct a landing in inclement weather conditions and should be assigned as the PNF to monitor the aircraft's instruments. As the visibility at the time was less than 3000 ft, the captain should have been at the controls instead of the first officer.

As Flight 011 reached the approach's minimum descent altitude (MDA) of 530 ft, which was the lowest permissible altitude if the crew did not have visual contact with the runway environment, the GPWS alert sounded. The warning was ignored as the crew were trying to locate the runway. The aircraft kept descending and the crew were still not able to obtain visual contact with the runway as the presence of fog had deteriorated the visibility. The captain called, "Not okay, altitude hold," instructing the first officer to press the altitude hold button so that the autopilot would maintain the aircraft's altitude.

Air Bagan's standard operating procedures (SOP) clearly stated that if an aircraft had passed the airport's minimum descent altitude in inclement weather conditions, an approach must be aborted; thus, the crew should have flown the missed approach procedure. The crew, however, decided to press the altitude hold button, even though they were just about 100 ft above the ground. As the aircraft was already too low for a missed approach, it crashed onto the trees, separating the left wing.

The crew's situational awareness had deteriorated because of the high workload. Their lack of situational awareness probably had also been affected by their landing order. The presence of other aircraft behind Flight 011 led to the increase of the crew's workload. As the crew were pre-occupied with the landing, the captain couldn't address the flight officer on problems regarding the aircraft's position and rate of descent.

=== Conclusion ===
The final report concluded that the primary cause of the accident was the crew's decision to descend below the approach procedure's minimum descent altitude of 160 metres (530 ft) without having the runway in sight. At that point, the airline's standard operating procedure would have called for an aborted landing to be immediately initiated. The report cited as contributory factors the captain's inadequate risk assessment in designating the first officer as pilot flying for the approach in the given weather conditions, and an increased pressure on the flight crew to complete the landing due to the presence of other aircraft on approach to Heho at the time. Three safety recommendations were made.

== See also ==
- Commonwealth Commuter Flight 317
- Asiana Airlines Flight 214
- Iberia Airlines Flight 610
