= Allan Lokos =

Allan Lokos is the founder and guiding teacher of the Community Meditation Center located on New York City's upper west side. He is the author of Pocket Peace: Effective Practices for Enlightened Living , Patience: The Art of Peaceful Living, and Through the Flames: Overcoming Disaster Through Compassion, Patience, and Determination. His writing has appeared in The Huffington Post, Tricycle magazine, Beliefnet, and several anthologies.

Among the places he has taught are Columbia University Teachers College, Albert Einstein College of Medicine, The Barre Center for Buddhist Studies, Marymount Manhattan College, The Rubin Museum of Art Brainwave Series, BuddhaFest, NY Insight Meditation Center, The NY Open Center, Tibet House US, and Insight Meditation Community of Washington. Lokos has practiced meditation since the mid-nineties and studied with such renowned teachers as Sharon Salzberg, Thích Nhất Hạnh, Joseph Goldstein, Andrew Olendzki, and Stephen Batchelor.

Earlier in this life Lokos enjoyed a successful career as a professional singer. He was in the original Broadway companies of Oliver!, Pickwick (musical), and the Stratford Festival/Broadway production of The Pirates of Penzance.

On Christmas Day, 2012, Lokos and his wife Susanna Weiss boarded Air Bagan Flight 11 which crashed while landing in Myanmar. Doctors in Thailand said that he could not possibly survive his injuries. Yet he did and has gone on to thrive in his teaching and writing. His book, Through the Flames, tells the story of the accident and offers a wide array of teachings from the Buddhist perspective. His against all odds recovery and joyful outlook have become an inspiration for many.

== Books ==
- Lokos, Allan (2010). Pocket Peace: Effective Practices for Enlightened Living. New York: Jeremy P. Tarcher/Penguin. ISBN 9781585427819.
- Lokos, Allan (2012). Patience: the Art of Peaceful Living. New York: Jeremy P. Tarcher/Penguin. ISBN 9781585429004.
- Lokos, Allan (2015). Through the Flames: Overcoming Disaster Through Compassion, Patience, and Determination. New York: Jeremy P. Tarcher/Penguin. ISBN 9780399171802.
