= Ice Wonderland =

Amusement park in Yangon, Myanmar

- Interactive map of Ice Wonderland
- Location: Yangon, Myanmar
- Coordinates: 16°47′43.75″N 96°9′59.62″E
- Owner: Jian Xi Long Dai Culture Limited from China and Asia Myanmar Consortium Development from Myanmar
- Operating season: Permanently Closed

Ice Wonderland was a tech-driven theme park created by Chinese sculptors. It was located at Kandawgyi Park in the Yangon region of Southeast Asia. The park was a joint venture between Jian Xi Long Dai Culture Limited and Asia Myanmar Consortium Development. Construction of the park began in September 2011 and it opened to the public on February 25, 2012, but closed a year later.

Ice Wonderland consisted of massive ice sculptures, featuring characters such as the Smurfs and the Seven Dwarves, contained within a gigantic freezer. Sculpture displays were kept between -5 °C and -10 °C, and were changed every three months to preserve their appearance and to prevent melting. Jackets and rubber boots were provided to customers, who had to first adjust due to the great temperature difference between the park and the outside. Other attractions included an ice slide, toboggan rides for children, an arcade area with a variety of games, and an attraction called Fire Man, where players can act as a fireman and spray water onto a screen to put out a fire. 5D movies and snacks were also to be available to park attendees.

== Entrance fees ==
The entrance fee was 4000 kyat (US$4.06) for adults and 3000 kyat (US$3.05) for children.
