= Air Bagan =

Airline from Myanmar

Air Bagan အဲပုဂံ
IATA	ICAO	Call sign
W9	JAB	AIR BAGAN
- Founded: June 2004
- Ceased operations: August 2018
- Operating bases: Yangon International Airport; Mandalay International Airport
- Frequent-flyer program: Royal Lotus Plus
- Fleet size: 4
- Destinations: 17
- Parent company: Htoo Trading Co. Ltd
- Headquarters: Yangon, Myanmar
- Key people: Tay Za (Founder); Htoo Thet Htwe (Chairman)
- Website: www.airbagan.com

Air Bagan Limited (Burmese: အဲပုဂံ) was an airline headquartered in Bahan Township, Yangon, Myanmar. It operated domestic scheduled services within Myanmar, as well as to Thailand with codeshare flights with Asian Wings Airways. Its main bases were Yangon International Airport and Mandalay International Airport. In 2018, the airline ceased operations.

== History ==
The airline was established in June 2004 and started operations on 15 November 2004. It was owned by Htoo Trading Co. Ltd. Its first international service was flown from Yangon to Bangkok on 15 May 2007, and the second to Singapore from 7 September 2007. Air Bagan was listed as a Specially Designated National by the United States Department of the Treasury for its association with the Government of Myanmar, meaning U.S. citizens are generally prohibited from dealing with the airline by U.S. sanctions against the government of Myanmar.

When Cyclone Nargis struck Lower Myanmar in May 2008, the Burmese government gave Air Bagan and its parent company, Htoo Trading Co. Ltd responsibility to reconstruct the badly devastated town of Bogale in the Ayeyarwady Delta.

In August 2015 Air Bagan announced that it suspended all flights. All flights were then operated by its code-sharing partner Asian Wings, which is also owned by the Htoo Trading Co. Ltd.

The airline ceased operations again and handed back its licence to the authorities in August 2018.

== Destinations ==
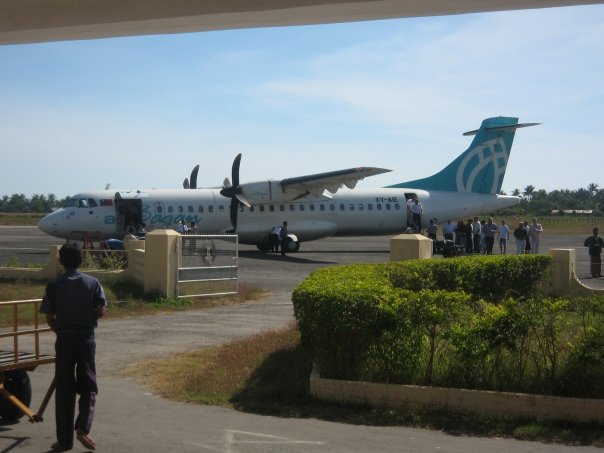
Air Bagan ATR 72-212 at Sittwe Airport

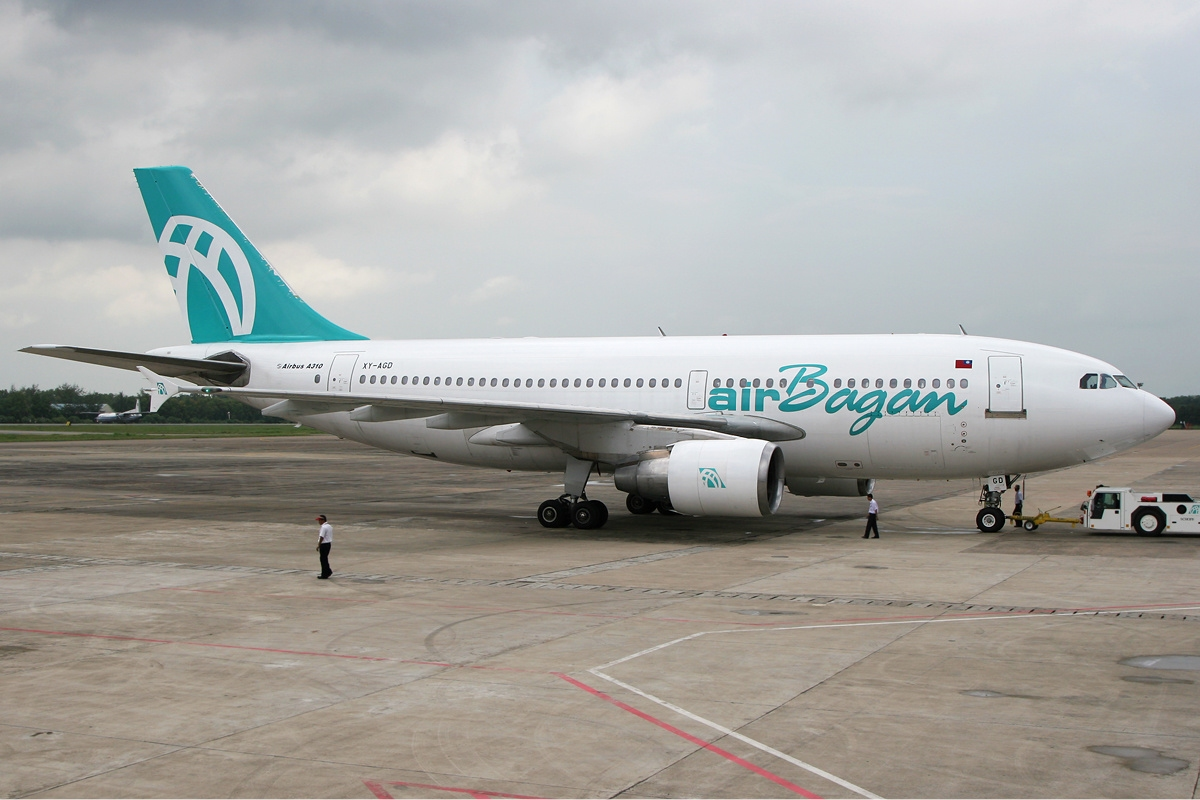
A now retired Air Bagan Airbus A310-200

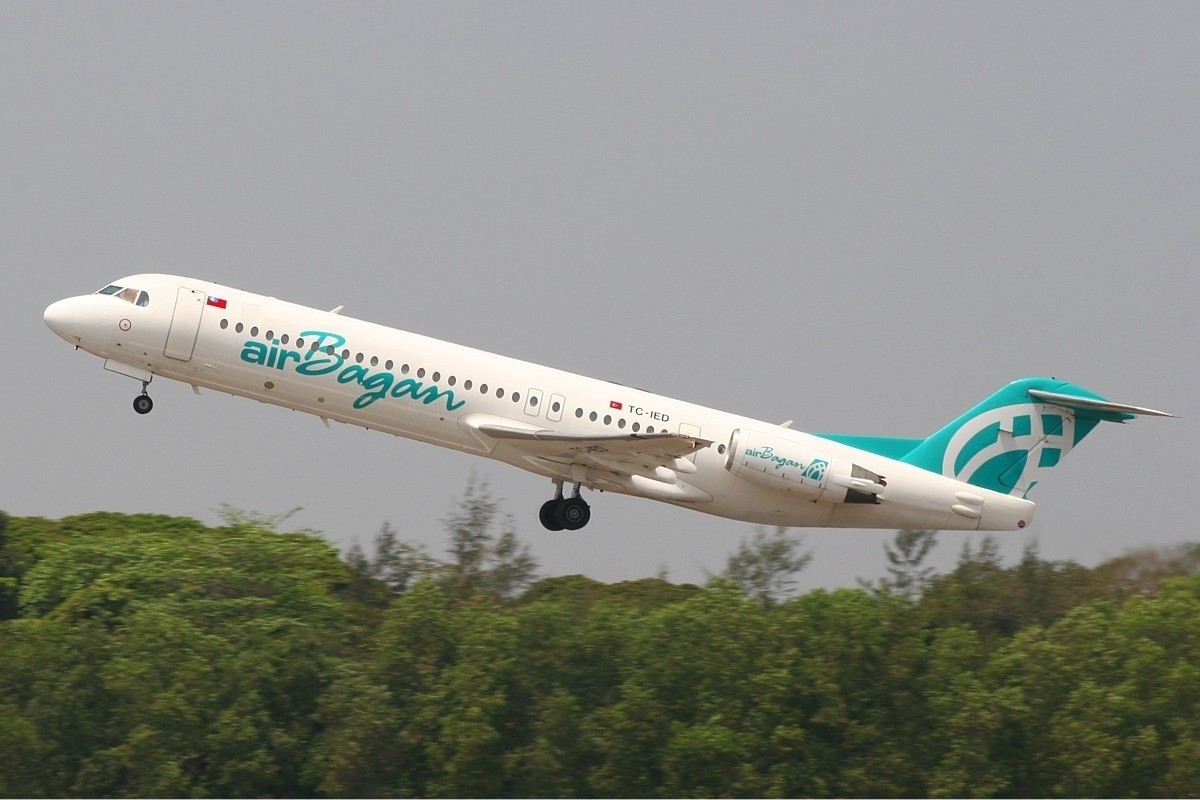
A now retired Air Bagan Fokker 100

Air Bagan served the following destinations:

- Myanmar
  - Ayeyarwady Region
    - Pathein - Pathein Airport
  - Kachin State
    - Myitkyina - Myitkyina Airport
    - Putao - Putao Airport
  - Mandalay Region
    - Bagan - Nyaung U Airport
    - Mandalay - Mandalay International Airport Base
    - Naypyidaw - Naypyidaw International Airport
  - Rakhine State
    - Sittwe - Sittwe Airport
    - Thandwe - Thandwe Airport
  - Sagaing Region
    - Kalaymyo - Kalaymyo Airport
  - Shan State
    - Heho - Heho Airport
    - Kengtung - Kengtung Airport
    - Lashio - Lashio Airport
    - Tachileik - Tachilek Airport
  - Tanintharyi Region
    - Dawei - Dawei Airport
    - Kawthaung - Kawthaung Airport
  - Yangon Region
    - Yangon - Yangon International Airport
- Thailand
    - Chiang Mai - Chiang Mai International Airport

== Fleet ==
As of 17 November 2021, Air Bagan's fleet included the following aircraft:

Air Bagan fleet
Aircraft	In Fleet	Orders	Notes
ATR 42-320	1	–	
ATR 72-500	3	–	
Total	4	–	

Former fleets

- 2 Airbus A310-200
- 2 Fokker 100

In 2015, the airline pauses operations after an ATR 72 (Registration: XY-AIH) skied of the runway at Yangon International Airport, leaving them with only one plane left.

== Accidents and incidents ==
- On 19 February 2008, an Air Bagan ATR 72 overran the runway at Putao Airport injuring two people.
- On 25 December 2012, Air Bagan Flight 11 a Fokker 100 registered XY-AGC, crash-landed near Heho Airport, killing one on board, one on the ground and injuring eleven. Among the injured was the well-known meditation teacher Allan Lokos, who was severely burned during his escape from the crashed aircraft.

== See also ==
- List of defunct airlines of Myanmar
