= Rachel Tayza =

Burmese pop singer

Rachel Tayza ရေချယ်တေဇ
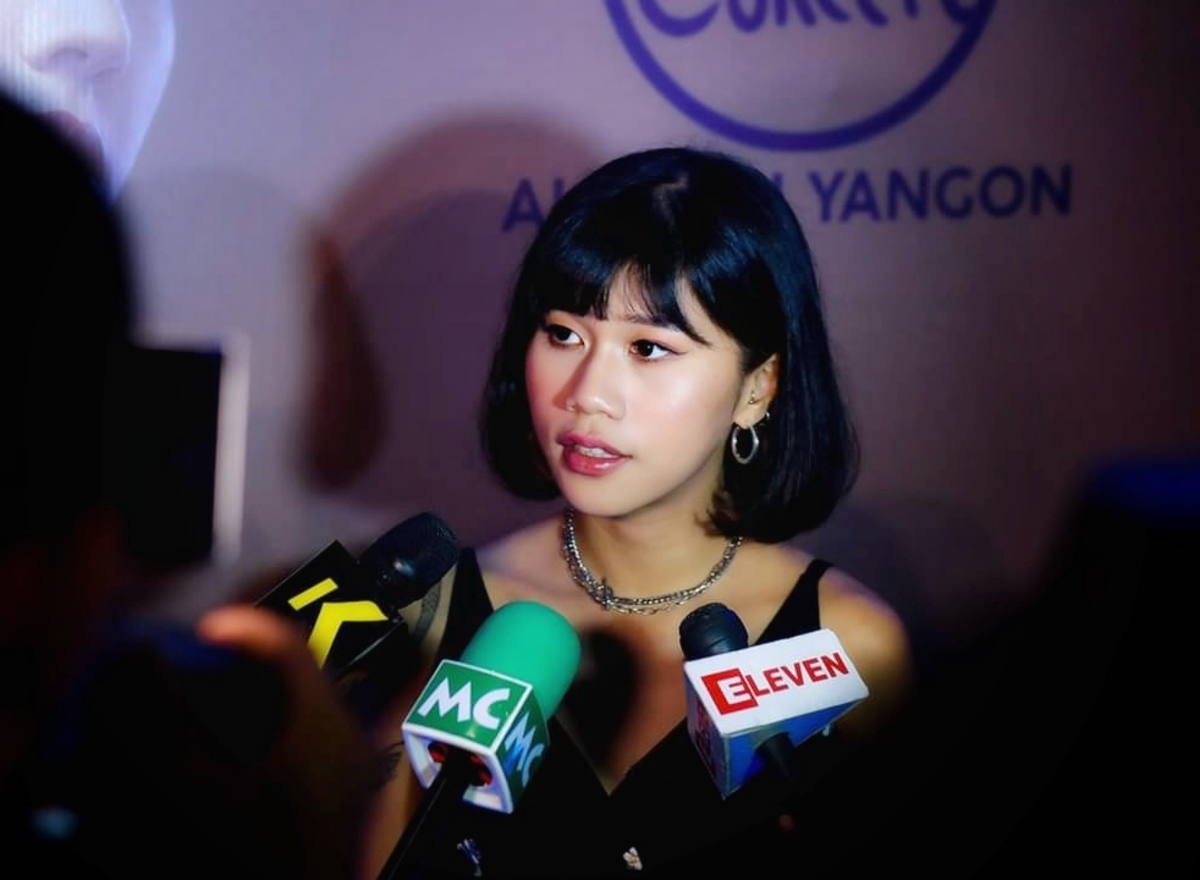
- Tayza in 2019

Background information
- Born: Htoo Htwe Tayza; September 14, 1996 (age 29); Yangon, Myanmar
- Genres: Indie pop
- Occupation(s): Singer, Songwriter
- Instruments: Vocals; Guitar
- Years active: 2017–present

Rachel Tayza (Burmese: ရေချယ်တေဇ; born Htoo Htwe Tayza on 14 September 1996), also known as RACHEL, is a Burmese pop singer, songwriter, and fashion designer. She rose to fame with her solo album, Kabar. She is the daughter of Burmese business tycoon Tay Za. Since January 2023, she has faced sanctions from the US government for providing financial support to the military regime in Myanmar.

== Early life ==
Rachel was born on 14 September 1996 to Tay Za and Thida Zaw, the youngest of three children. Her father, Tay Za, is a business tycoon and chairman of Htoo Group of Companies.

== Career ==
Rachel started learning and playing the guitar at the age of 13. She discovered her real passion and has devoted her life to becoming a musician. She began her music career by making cover songs and posting them on YouTube. As a notable achievement, she made the background music album for the popular film Nya. Since then, she has become popular, having performed in various major music concerts and even live concerts.

In 2018, she started endeavoring to be able to produce and distribute her first solo album. She released her debut solo album, Kabar, on September 21, 2019, which was officially distributed to all parts of Myanmar. The album was a commercial success, reaching the top of the album charts. On 24 August 2019, she performed in Alive in Yangon's second music concert, called The Blue Night, together with Mary and Gabriel Phway. In December 2019, she released a single song and music video with featured artist X-Boxin called "Thu" on her Facebook page, which earned 1 million views within 24 hours and was the longest-leading No. 3 song in the Myanmar Top Chart on Joox.

After graduating from Polimoda in 2024, she is currently working as a fashion designer in Italy.

== Sanctions ==
On 31 January 2023, on the eve of the 2nd anniversary of the 2021 Myanmar coup d'état, the US government sanctioned Rachel for providing financial support to Myanmar's military regime due to her association with the Htoo Group of Companies. She is a director and shareholder of numerous subsidiaries and associated companies under the Htoo Group of Companies umbrella. She owned Nova Lifestyle Holdings, and its registration is currently suspended.

On 8 March 2024, the activist monitoring group Justice for Myanmar called for the Italian government to investigate Rachel Tayza. They demanded that her assets be seized and that she be expelled from the country. JFM reports that she is a director of at least seven private companies, including Htoo Group's businesses with direct links to the Burmese military that were established after the 2021 coup d'état. Additionally, according to JFM reports, Rachel Taze is also a director of the now-defunct Myanmar Avia Export Company Limited, which brokered Russian aircraft and spare parts.

== Discography ==
=== Albums ===
- Myit (for Nya film) (2018)
- Kabar (2019)

=== Singles ===
- Ser Myat Nar (2017)
- Ani Youn Alwan (2017)
- Thu (2019)
