= Kandawgyi Lake =

- ကန်တော်ကြီး
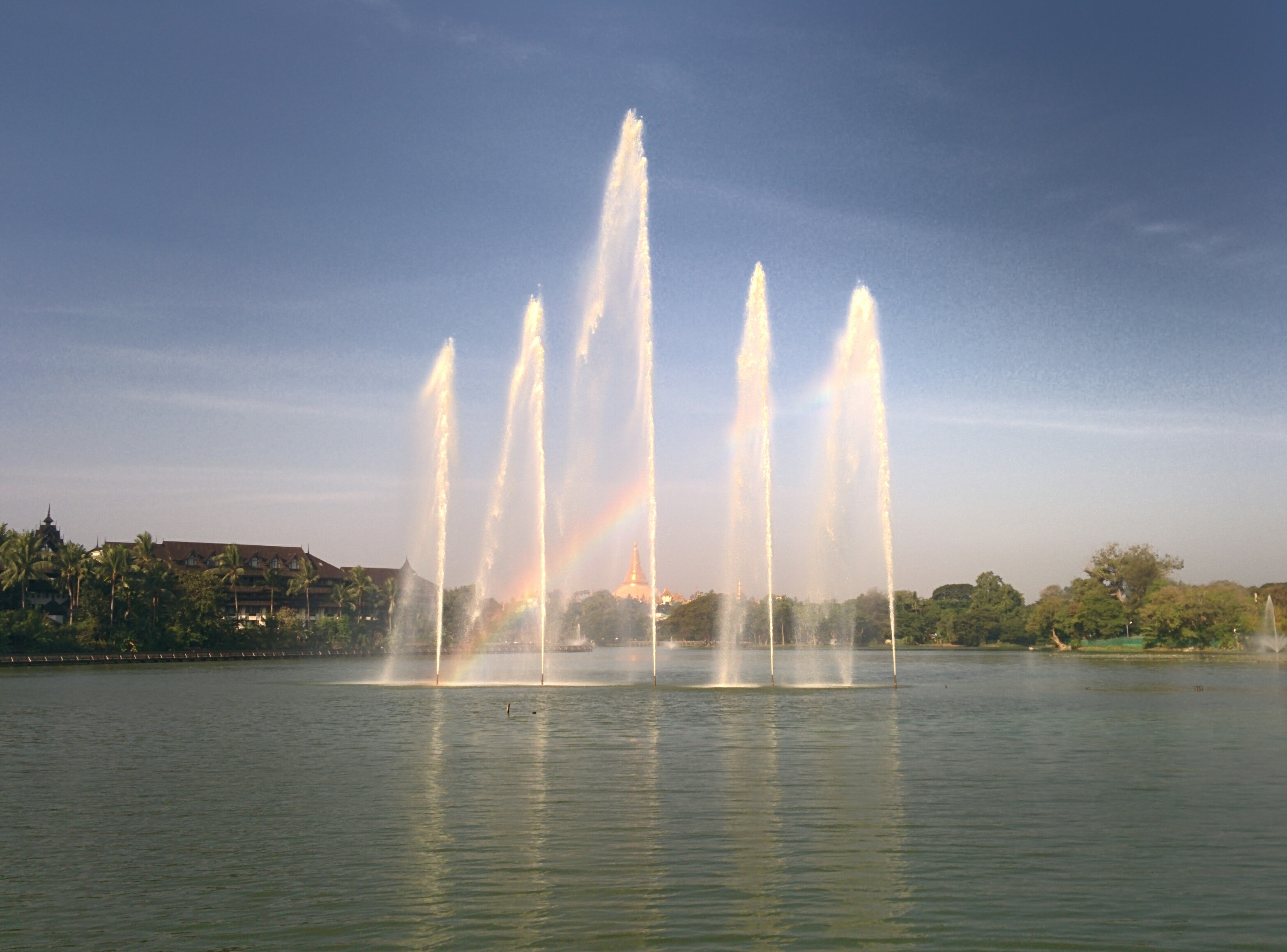

- Location within Myanmar
- Location: Yangon
- Coordinates: 16°47′43.75″N 96°9′59.62″E
- Type: reservoir
- Basin countries: Myanmar (Burma)
- Surface area: 150 acres (61 ha)
- Average depth: 45 inches (115 cm)
- Settlements: Yangon

Kandawgyi Lake (Burmese: ကန်တော်ကြီး pronounced [kàɰ̃dɔ̀dʑí]; lit. 'great royal lake') is one of two major lakes in Yangon, Myanmar. Located east of the Shwedagon Pagoda, the lake is artificial; water from Inya Lake is channeled through a series of pipes to Kandawgyi Lake. It was created to provide a clean water supply to the city during the British colonial administration. It is approximately 3 miles (4.8 km) in circumference, and has a depth of 20–45 inches (510–1,140 mm).

The 150-acre (61 ha) lake is surrounded by the 110-acre (45 ha) Kandawgyi Nature Park, Bogyoke Aung San Park, and the 69.25-acre (28.02 ha) Yangon Zoological Gardens, which consists of a zoo, an aquarium and an amusement park. In 2012, the park hosted Ice Wonderland.

The lake itself is bounded by Natmauk Street to its north and east, Bahan Street to its west, and Kanyeiktha Street to its south. The lake used to be the site of the Rangoon Rowing Club turned Kandawgyi Palace Hotel, which was gutted by a fire in 2017. Along the eastern shore of the lake is the famous Karaweik, a concrete replica of a Burmese royal barge built in 1972. It houses a buffet restaurant today.

On 15 April 2010, during the Burmese New Year festival, three bombs exploded on a road near the lake; 10 people were killed and 178 injured.

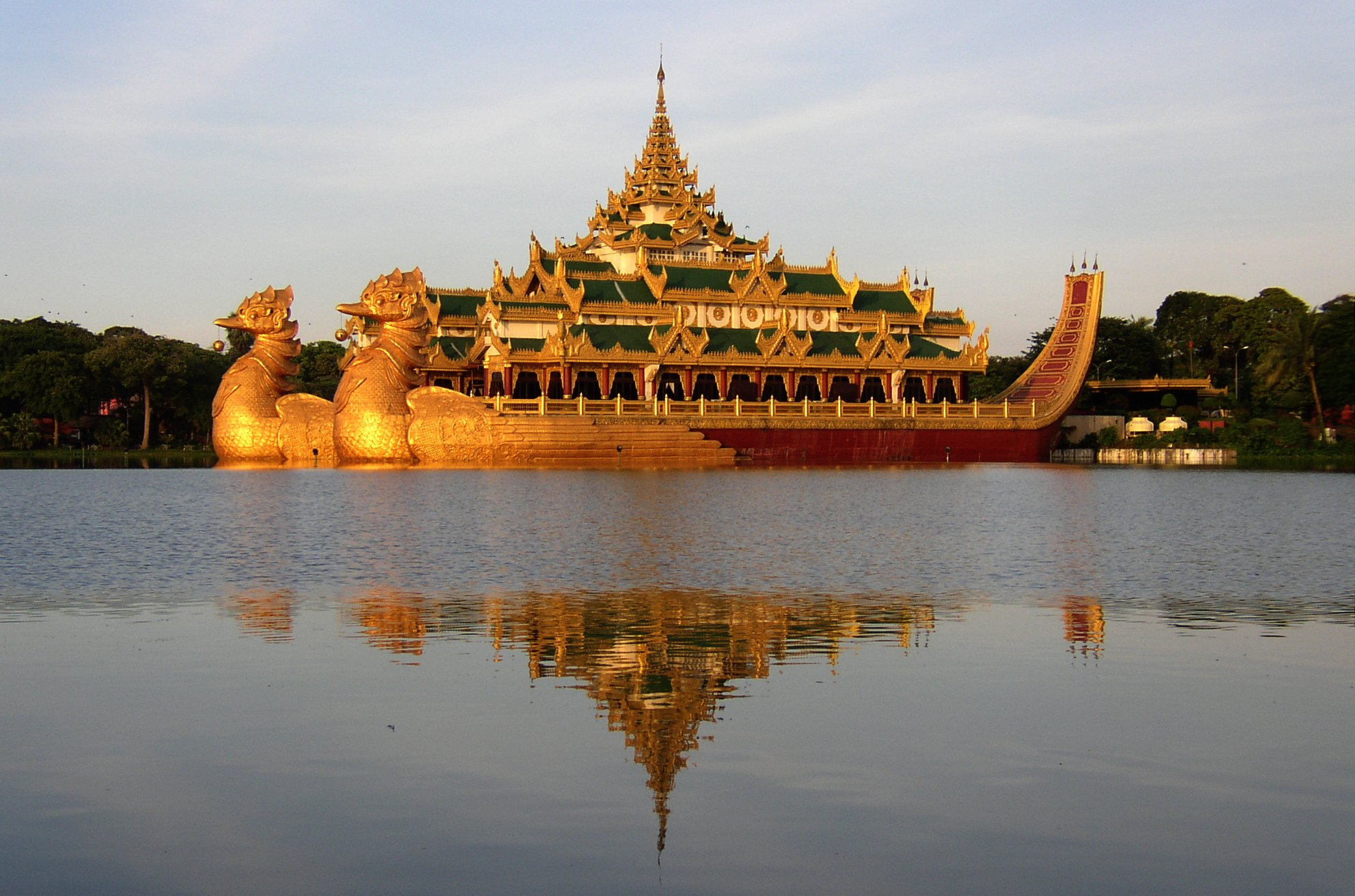
The Karaweik is a famous icon along Kandawgyi Lake's shores.

Kandawgyi Lake in 1895

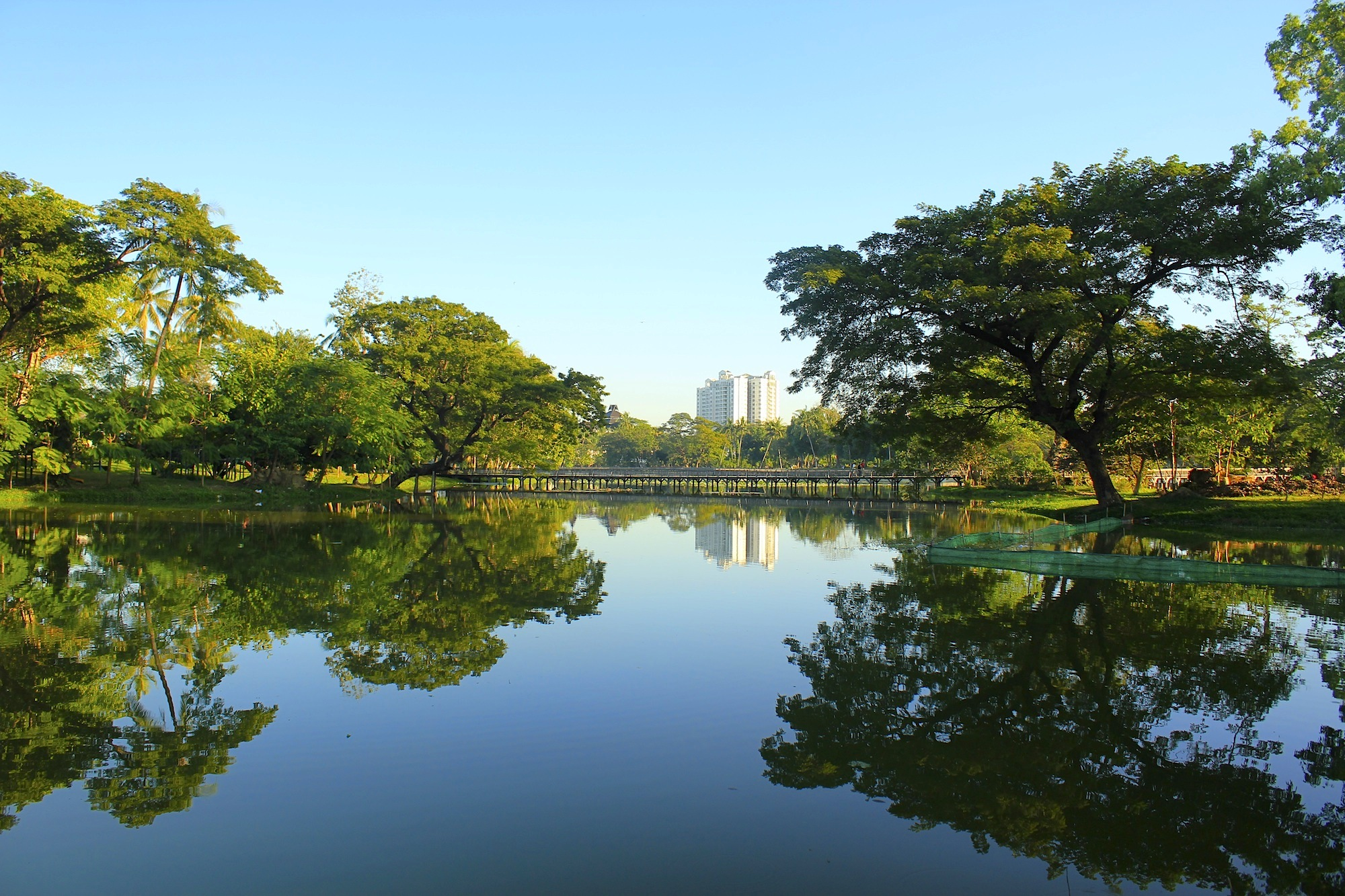
Kandawgyi Lake in 2011

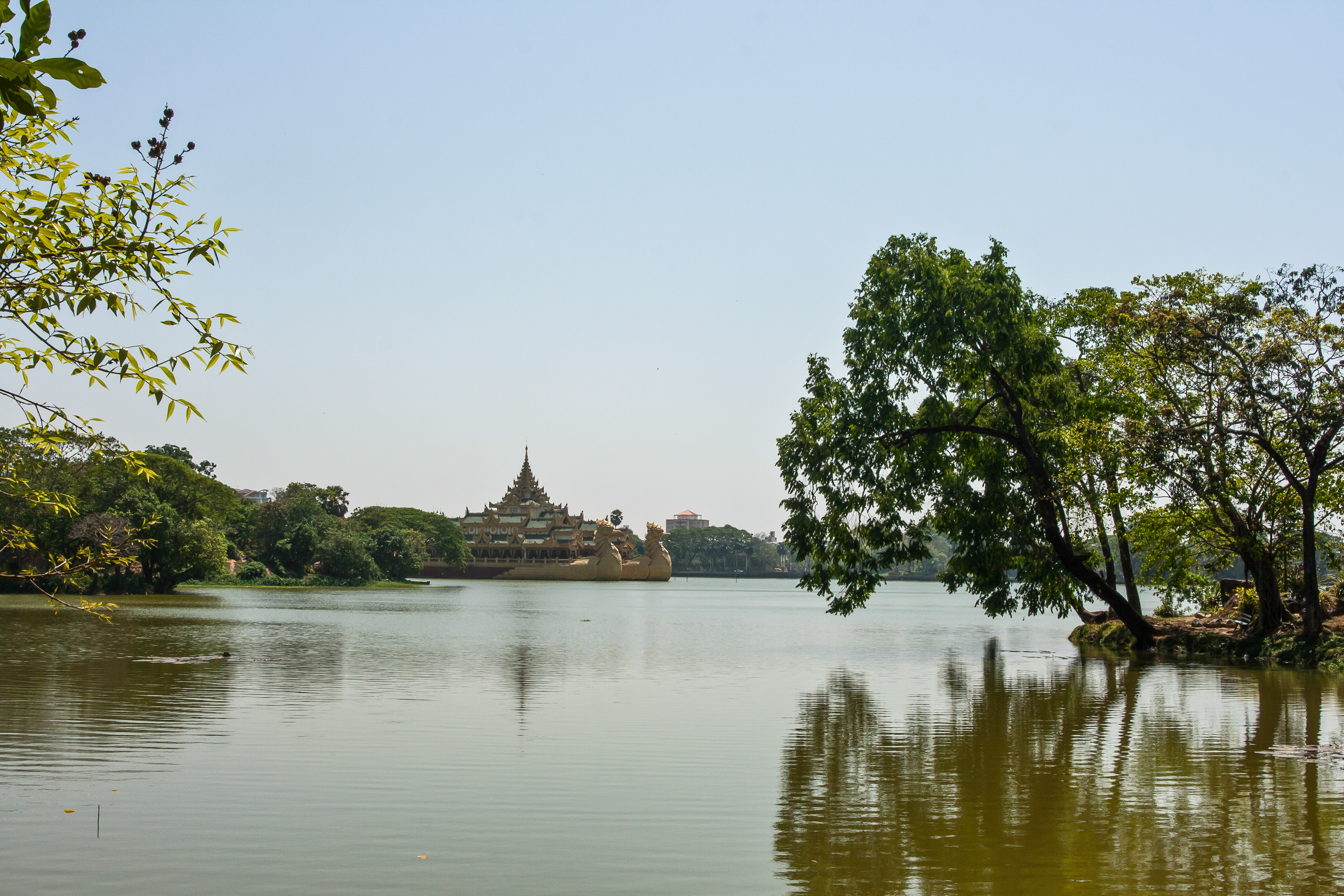
View over Kandawgyi Lake with Karaweik in the distance
