= Asia Green Development Bank =

Commercial Bank in Myanmar

Asia Green Development Bank (AGD)
- Native name: အာရှစိမ်းလန်းမှုဖွံ့ဖြိုးရေးဘဏ်
- Industry: Financial services
- Founded: July 2, 2010
- Headquarters: Yangon, Burma
- Services: Banking
- Total assets: Ks.1.2 Trillion (US$794 million)
- Website: www.agdbank.com

Asia Green Development Bank (Burmese: အာရှစိမ်းလန်းမှုဖွံ့ဖြိုးရေးဘဏ်; abbreviated AGD Bank) is a public commercial bank in Burma (Myanmar) providing banking services and products. It was one of 4 private banks to commence operations in August 2010 when the government issued four new banking licences and the first new financial institutions in the country since the establishment of Innwa Bank in 1997. Its headquarters are situated in Yangon, Myanmar. The bank began trading on the Yangon Stock Exchange when it opened in 2016. The bank was founded by Tay Za and was a subsidiary of parent company Htoo Group, whose 15% stake was sold to new shareholders. In 2016 Infosys provided AGD Bank with Finacle front and backend solutions for online banking systems.

== Brief Info ==
The AGD Bank's Head Office and first branch was successfully opened on August 6, 2010 in Nay Pyi Taw under the organization of Htoo Group of Companies. In the past, AGD bank was 100% owned and operated by “Htoo Group of Companies” which is engaged in trading, energy and mining, construction, agriculture, hotel, travel and tourism business. But on February 18, 2013 with a new slogan “We, all Myanmar will develop together”, AGD bank was converted to Public Company, managed independently where the shares capital stands at Ks.30.0873 billion of 601746 shares in the fiscal year. The share capital has since then grown to Ks.50.59 billion in 2021.

AGD Bank has been 77 branches across the country until June 2019. With establish an International Banking Department, authorized as Dealer and Money Changer Licenses 65 foreign exchange counters services to the general public.

== Services ==
AGD has 77 branches and 65 foreign exchange counters throughout Myanmar, operating across Corporate, Retail, and International Banking. The bank is headed up by Htoo Htet Tay Za, who became managing director in 2015. In 2016 AGD Bank partnered with TrueMoney to offer customers mobile banking.

In 2017, AGD Bank became the first bank in Myanmar to accept EMV based UnionPay card transactions at its ATMs. AGD launched three AGD Visa cards in September 2018, the Visa Classic Card, Visa Gold Card and Visa Platinum Card.

== See also ==
- List of banks
- List of banks in Burma
