= Myanmar Football Federation =

Governing body of association football in Myanmar

AFC
- Founded: 1947; 79 years ago (as Burma Football Federation)
- Headquarters: Yangon; Waizayantar st, In front of Thuwanna Stadium
- FIFA affiliation: 1948
- AFC affiliation: 1954
- AFF affiliation: 1996
- President: Zaw Zaw
- Website: the-mff.org

The Myanmar Football Federation (abbr. MFF; Burmese: မြန်မာနိုင်ငံ ဘောလုံး အဖွဲ့ချုပ်) is the governing body of football in Myanmar. The MFF oversee the Burmese men's national team, the women's national team, youth men's national teams (under-23, under-20, under-17) youth women's national teams (under-20, under-17), National Futsal team, National beach soccer team as well as national football championships, professional club competitions and futsal championship.

== History ==
Reportedly introduced during the British colonial era by James George Scott, a British colonial administrator, football has been the most popular sport in the country. The Burma Football Federation was founded in 1947, a year before the country's independence from the United Kingdom. The BFF joined FIFA in 1948, and the Asian Football Confederation in 1954.

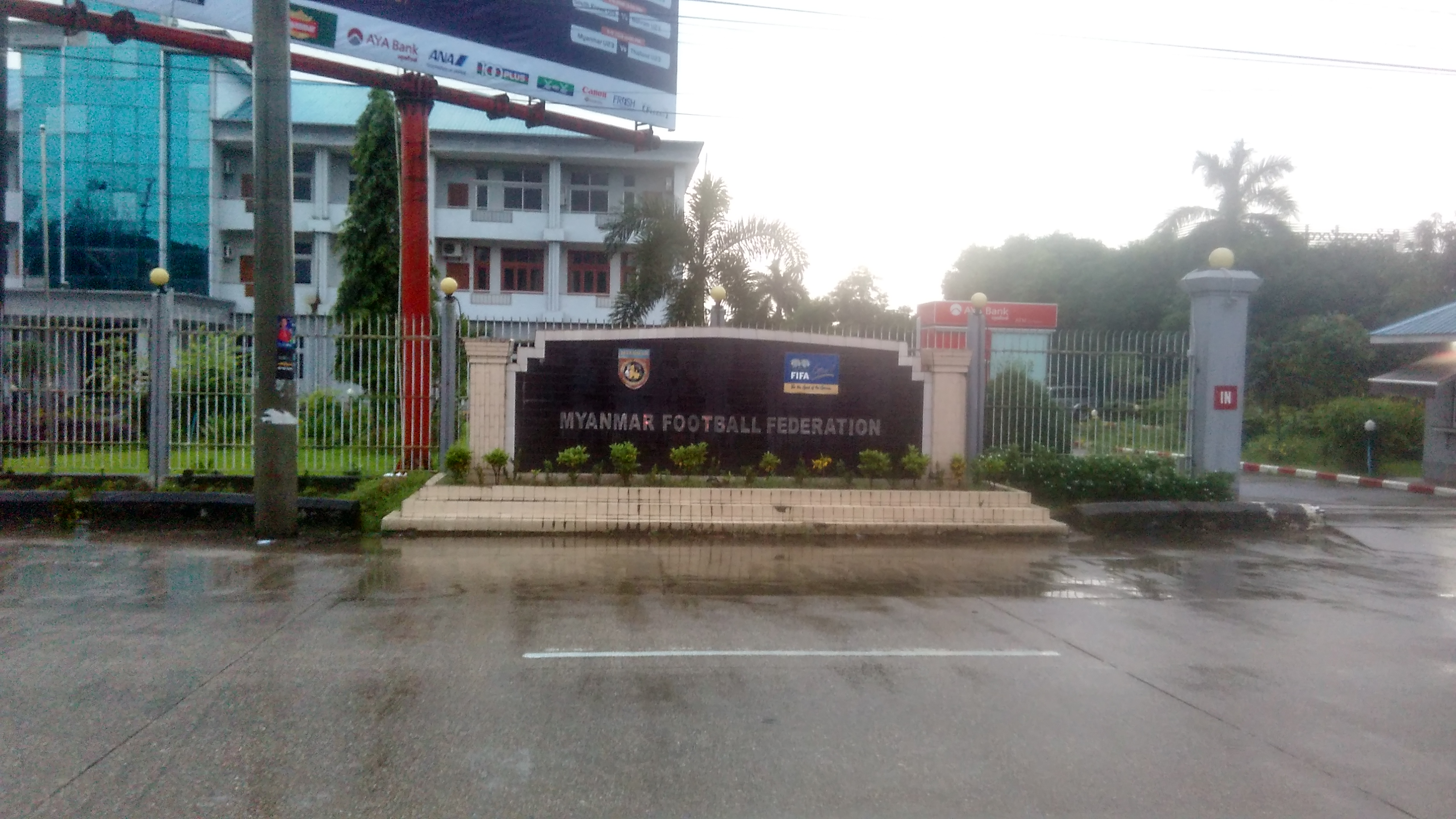

The federation launched the first States and Divisions Football Championship in 1952. The competition became a highly popular avenue for attracting national talent. Burma became a top Asian football power, along Iran and South Korea, winning two Asian Games tournaments (1966, 1970) and then unprecedented five South East Asian Games tournaments (1965–1973) as well as coming in second in the 1968 Asian Cup tournament. Burma thoroughly dominated the U-19/U-20 Asian Cup, reaching the finals nine times and winning the tournament seven times, during a ten-year span between 1961 and 1970.

Starting from the mid-1970s, the country's football success—a source of much national pride—also declined rapidly, along with the country's precipitous economic decline. (Aside from a few regional tournament wins, the Burmese men's national team has not won any major football competition since 1973.) The federation did (or could do) little to promote development of football, nor nurture the talent through professional league competitions. Until 1996, the country's main football league consisted of Yangon-based clubs run by government ministries and known for corruption. Although private football clubs were allowed to join the Myanmar Premier League in 1996, the league still did not attract much following by Burmese public. In December 2008, the MFF announced the formation a new national professional league, the Myanmar National League, which held its inaugural season in 2009.

In accordance with FIFA regulations, the MFF reportedly became an independent organization, free of government control, in March 2009.

== Competitions run by the MFF ==
- M League
- M League 2
- Myanmar Women League
- MNL-2 Promotion Amateur Club Tournament
- General Aung San Shield
- MNL Cup
- Myanmar U21/20 Youth League
- Myanmar U17 Youth League
- Myanmar U15 Youth League
- MFF Futsal League I
- MFF Futsal League II
- MFF Futsal Championship
- MFF U-19 Youth Futsal League
- MFF U-16 Youth Futsal League
- MFF Women's Futsal League
- MFF Women's Futsal Championship

== Programmes ==
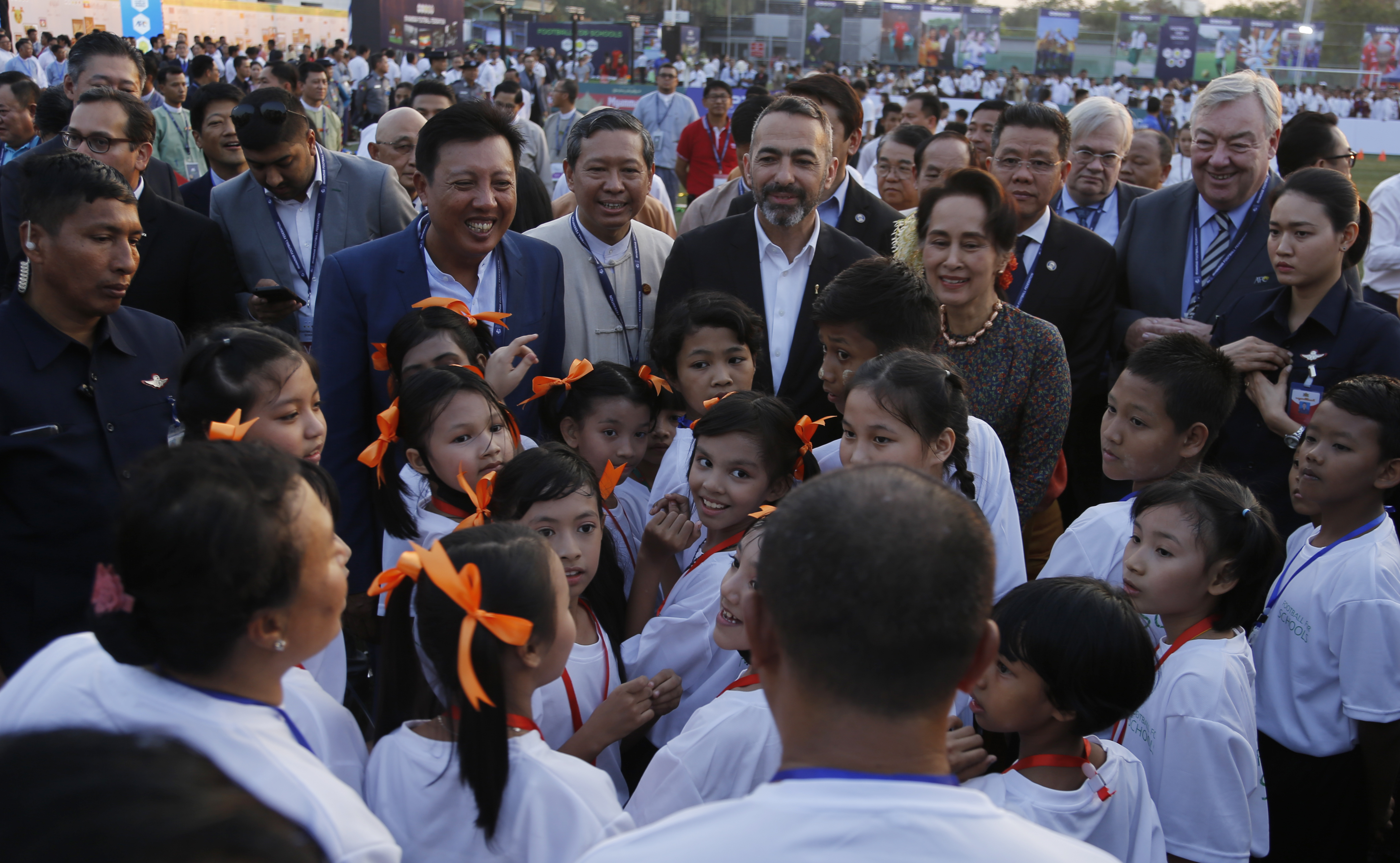
Together with Youri Djorkaeff, Aung San Suu Kyi meets the school kids at FIFA Football For Schools launching ceremony.

The MFF has launched the FIFA Football for Schools project with the support of the FIFA Foundation on 31 January 2020. The event, hosted by MFF President Zaw Zaw, was attended by the State Counsellor H. E. Aung San Suu Kyi, Union Minister for the Health and Sports Dr. Myint Htwe, Union Minister for Education Dr. Myo Thein Gyi, FIFA Foundation CEO Youri Djorkaeff, together with guests, presidents and secretaries from local township football associations.

In 2026, the MFF announced that it will conduct free summer basic football and futsal training programmes for children aged 10–15 across five cities - Yangon, Mandalay, Taunggyi, Pathein and Mawlamyine - to promote physical fitness, personal development and interest in the sport while nurturing a new generation of players.

The programme will run in two batches, from 9 March to 8 April and from 20 April to 20 May. A total of 1,700 trainees will participate, including 500 football and 200 futsal trainees in Yangon, 400 football trainees in Mandalay, and 200 football trainees each in Taunggyi, Pathein and Mawlamyine, where participants will receive basic football skills and tactical training.

=== Association staff ===
Name	Position	Source
(Myanmar) Zaw Zaw	President	
(Myanmar) Pye Phyo Tayza	Vice-president	
(Myanmar) Sai Sam Htun	2nd Vice-president	
(Myanmar) Ko Ko Thein	General secretary	
(Myanmar) Than Zaw	Treasurer	
(Myanmar) Tin Myint Aung	Technical director	
(Germany) Michael Feichtenbeiner	Team coach (men's)	
(Myanmar) Thet Thet Win	Team coach (women's)	
(Myanmar) Zaw Minn Htike	Media/Communications Director	
(Myanmar) Ye Win Tun	Local Competition Department Director	
(Myanmar) Hla Min	Referee Department Director	

== See also ==
- Myanmar national football team
- Myanmar women's national football team
- Myanmar National League
- Myanmar national under-23 football team
- Myanmar Grand Royal Challenge Cup
- Myanmar women's national under-20 football team
- Myanmar Premier League
- Myanmar national under-17 football team
- Football in Burma
- Myanmar national under-20 football team
- Myanmar national futsal team
- Myanmar women's national under-17 football team
- Myanmar national beach soccer team
- Myanmar Football Academy
