= Tay Za =

Burmese businessman (born 1964)

Tayza
- တေဇ
- Born: 18 July 1964 (age 61); Rangoon, Burma
- Other names: Tayza, Teza
- Occupation: Chairman of Htoo Group of Companies
- Title: Thiri Pyanchi
- Spouse: Thida Zaw
- Children: Pye Phyo Tayza; Htoo Htet Tay Za; Rachel Tayza
- Parent(s): Daw Ohn (mother); Myint Swe (father)
- Relatives: Thiha (brother)

Tay Za (Burmese: တေဇ, pronounced [tèza̰]; born 18 July 1964) is a Burmese business tycoon and Chairman of Htoo Group of Companies. He is a close associate of the country's former head of state, Than Shwe. He is the first Burmese entrepreneur to appear on the cover of Forbes Asia and is the richest man in Myanmar.

== Early life ==
Tay Za was born on 18 July 1964 in Yangon. His father, Myint Swe, was a retired lieutenant colonel at the Ministry of Industry. His father was appointed to the top position at the Tatmadaw Military Research Unit, the equivalent of the Central Intelligence Agency in the United States, after finishing a training course at Fort Benning in Georgia. Myint Swe was also close with General Ne Win, the army general who seized power in the 1962 Burmese coup d'état, helped his youngest son Tay Za win the armed forces' trust. He is the youngest of six siblings. He passed the 10th standard at TTC in Yangon in 1982. He attended the Defence Services Academy, as part of the 1982 intake (27th Batch), but dropped out during his third year to marry Thida Zaw (daughter of U Zaw and Daw Htoo of Gyobingauk), against the wishes of both families.

== Business holdings ==
His major business interests include Htoo Group and Air Bagan, the country's first and only fully privately owned airline. In 2006–2007, Htoo Trading, a division of Htoo Holdings involved in teak log exports, was Burma's top private exporter and fifth largest overall, with gross revenues of $65.1 million. He began his career in the 1980s and started Htoo Group in the early 1990s to extract timber from Burma's forests.

Other activities include construction, tourism, infrastructure projects, and mobile phone services. He entered the banking industry and set up Asia Green Development Bank when a licence was granted by military junta in 2010 before giving up its power after general election. His bank was sanctioned by US Government soon after it was established. But it was removed from the list in 2013.

He was an arms broker for ex-military regime, helping to buy military hardware from Russia.

Tay Za's airline Air Bagan is the main sponsor of Yangon United Football Club, one of the nine professional football clubs in Myanmar competing for the Myanmar National League (MNL) title. His son is chairman of the club.

He kept a low profile while the National League for Democracy was in power, making a comeback after the 2021 coup when he joined a high-ranking military delegation to Moscow in May 2022 for the procurement of arms and military hardware. The military council allows Tay Za's Htoo Group to import over US$5.4 million worth of palm oil per month to Myanmar.

== Sanctions ==
In 2007, following protests against the junta on the streets of many cities in Burma, the United States government imposed sanctions against Tay Za and the companies he controls, including Htoo Trading and Air Bagan.

On 19 May 2010, his son, Pye Phyo Tayza, lost a legal battle to overturn European Union sanctions against him at the Council of the European Union. In March 2012, the European Court of Justice ruled that Pye Phyo Tay Za be allowed to regain access to his accounts in Europe, as he had testified that he was not connected to his father's business interests.

On 7 October 2016, the United States Department of the Treasury implemented termination of the Burma Sanctions Program in accordance with the Executive Order issued on the same date by the U.S President Barack Obama, which effectively removed Tay Za, along with other Business Tycoons from OFAC's Specially Designated Nationals list.

On 2 September 2021, Tay Za and his business empire Htoo Group were sanctioned by the UK for providing financial support and arms to Myanmar's military. On 31 January 2022, the U.S. Department of the Treasury added Tay Za and his two sons to its Specially Designated Nationals (SDN) list.

== Reputation ==
Forbes noted that "[Tay Za] has a reputation as a generous boss who instills loyalty in 40,000 full-time staffers. Hundreds of employees have gone overseas to study, including Burma’s first female pilot, and perks quickly accrue to hardworking managers."

== Charity work ==
Tay Za established Htoo Foundation on 5 May 2008, after Cyclone Nargis devastated the Ayeyarwady Region and along with his group of companies provided emergency relief supplies to the survivors in Bogalay Township, spending over US$8 million for the reconstruction of schools, hospitals, monasteries and government offices in the area.

== Personal life ==
Tay Za married Thida Zaw in 1987, with whom he has three children, Pye Phyo Tay Za (b. 1987), Htoo Htet Tay Za (b. 1993 or 1994), and Rachel Tayza.
