= Htoo Group of Companies =

Burmese holding company

- Predecessor: Htoo Supply Company
- Founded: 1990; 36 years ago
- Headquarters: 5 Pyay Road, Hlaing Township, Yangon, Myanmar
- Key people: Tay Za, Chairman and Founder; Thiha, Vice Chairman; Pye Phyo Tay Za, Managing Director
- Revenue: US$65.1 million
- Number of employees: 40,000
- Subsidiaries: Air Bagan Holdings Company Ltd. Htoo Wood Products Company Ltd; Htoo Trading Company; Ayer Shwe Wah Company Ltd. Myanmar Avia Export Company Ltd. Myanmar Treasure Resorts; Pavo Aircraft Leasing Company Ltd. Pavo Trading Company Ltd.
- Website: www.htoo.com

The Htoo Group of Companies (HGC, Burmese: ထူးအုပ်စု ကုမ္ပဏီ) is a Burmese holding company, with headquarters at 5 Pyay Road, Hlaing Township, Yangon, Myanmar. HGC is the parent company of Air Bagan, a privately held Burmese airline company. The company has several subsidiaries. Htoo Wood Products Company Ltd. is engaged in logging and export of timber (especially teak). Htoo Trading Company, is engaged in construction, property development, agriculture, transportation, shipping, mining, hotels and tourism operations. Htoo Trading Company and Asia World Company were the first two construction companies granted contracts to build the new national capital in Naypyidaw. Htoo Trading Company is Burma's top private exporter and fifth largest overall, with gross revenues of $65.1 million.

== History ==
The HGC was established as Htoo Trading Company in 1990 . The name Htoo came from Htoo Supply Company established in 1958, by U Zaw Nyunt and Daw Htoo, the parents of Thida Zaw, Tay Za's wife. After the coup d'état by Ne Win's Burma Socialist Programme Party in 1962, Htoo Supply Company was nationalized. However, its rice mills and saw mills continued to operate as a family business.

Htoo Trading Company was established in 1990, by Tay Za, Thida Zaw, Myo Thant and Yu Zaw, soon after the 1988 coup d'état led by General Saw Maung. Myo Thant sold and handover the Htoo Trading Company to Tay Za and, the company was engaged in logging and timber exports in addition to its core rice milling and saw milling business. The company gradually gained access to large areas of virgin forest near the Burma-Thailand border. Htoo Trading Company was later expanded into the Htoo Group of Companies (HGC) as a result of diversification into other business sectors, reinvestment and expansion.

== Leadership ==
- Tay Za (born 1964) is the Founder and Chairman of HTOO Group of Companies. He became involved in the family business in Gyobingauk, a few miles south of Pyay in 1984. He is a close associate of General Than Shwe, chairman of the State Peace and Development Council (SPDC) and Commander-in-Chief of the Myanmar Armed Forces. Tay Za is also quite close to General Thura Shwe Mann, who he has known since the general was regional commander in the Irrawaddy delta. General Shwe Mann is Chief of Staff of the Myanmar Armed Forces and the third-highest-ranking member of the SPDC, after Than Shwe and Maung Aye (vice-chairman of the SPDC and Deputy Commander in Chief of the Myanmar Armed Forces). Tay Za consolidated his relationship with the junta by creating Myanmar Avia Export, Burma's sole representative of Russia's Export Military Industrial Group, (MAPO), and of the Russian helicopter company Rostvertol. Tay Za was instrumental in the junta's purchase of ten MiG-29 fighter aircraft for US$130 million.
- Thiha (born 1960), elder brother of Tay Za is the Vice Chairman of HTOO Group of Companies.
- Pye Phyo Tayza, eldest son of Tay Za is the managing director of HTOO Group of Companies.
- Kyaw Thein (born 1947) manages Tay Za's business offices in Singapore. He currently serves as a director for Air Bagan Holdings Company Ltd, Htoo Wood Products Company Ltd, Pavo Aircraft Leasing Co Ltd and Pavo Trading Co Ltd.

== Subsidiaries ==
Subsidiaries of HTOO Group of Companies include

- Aureum Palace Hotels & Resorts
- Air Bagan Holdings Company Ltd.
- APEX Petroleum Co., Ltd.
- Bagan Entertainment
- FM Bagan
- HTOO Trading Company
- HTOO Wood Products Company Ltd.
- HTOO Zoos and Gardens
- Myanmar Avia Export Company Ltd.: exclusive representative in Burma for Russia's Export Military Industrial Group (MAPO), and the Russian helicopter company Rostvertol; supplies the Burmese military with spare parts for its aircraft.
- Myanmar Treasure Resorts
- Pavo Aircraft Leasing Company Ltd.
- Pavo Trading Company Ltd.
- Asian Wings Airways
- Air Myanmar Aviation Services(AMAS) Company Ltd.
- Yangon United Football Club
- Elite Tech

== Sanctions ==
On October 18, 2007, the Office of Foreign Assets Control (OFAC) of the United States Department of the Treasury imposed financial sanctions against Tay Za, his wife Thidar Zaw, his eldest son Pyae Phyo Tay Za, and five of the companies controlled by Tay Za, including Htoo Trading Company and Air Bagan. The sanctions were instituted in response to protests against the junta on the streets of many cities in Burma in September 2007.

On 5 February 2008, those sanctions were expanded to include some of Tay Za's partners, including Aung Thet Mann, Thiha and U Kyaw Thein, as well as HGC itself. Also named in the new sanctions order were Khin Lay Thet, wife of General Thura Shwe Mann, Myint Myint Ko, wife of Construction Minister Mon Saw Tun, Tin Lin Myint, wife of Lieutenant General Ye Myint, the head of Military Affairs Security, and Myint Myint Soe, wife of Minister of Foreign Affairs Nyan Win.

The sanctions were expanded pursuant to Executive Order 13448, which authorizes the United States Secretary of the Treasury to designate senior regime officials, human rights violators in Burma, persons engaged in public corruption in Burma, financial and material supporters of the Government of Burma, and spouses and dependent children of previously designated individuals. The designation freezes any assets the designees may have subject to U.S. jurisdiction, and prohibits all financial and commercial transactions by any U.S. person with the designated companies and individuals.

The business being related to the government of Myanmar, since 2008, it is also subject to European Union sanctions which include seizing corporate and personal assets.

On 7 October 2016, the United States Department of the Treasury implemented termination of the Burma Sanctions Program in accordance with the Executive Order issued on the same date by the U.S. President Barack Obama, which effectively removed Tay Za, along with other Business Tycoons from OFAC's Specially Designated Nationals list, effectively removing HTOO Group of Companies and its subsidiaries off the previously imposed sanctions.

On 2 September 2021, the group and its chairman Tay Za were sanctioned by the UK for providing financial support and arms to Myanmar's military.

On 31 January 2022, Tay Za was sanctioned again by OFAC . On 25 March 2022, HTOO Group of Companies was sanctioned again by OFAC.
